= Macquarie University Sport and Aquatic Centre =

Athletic facility in Sydney, Australia

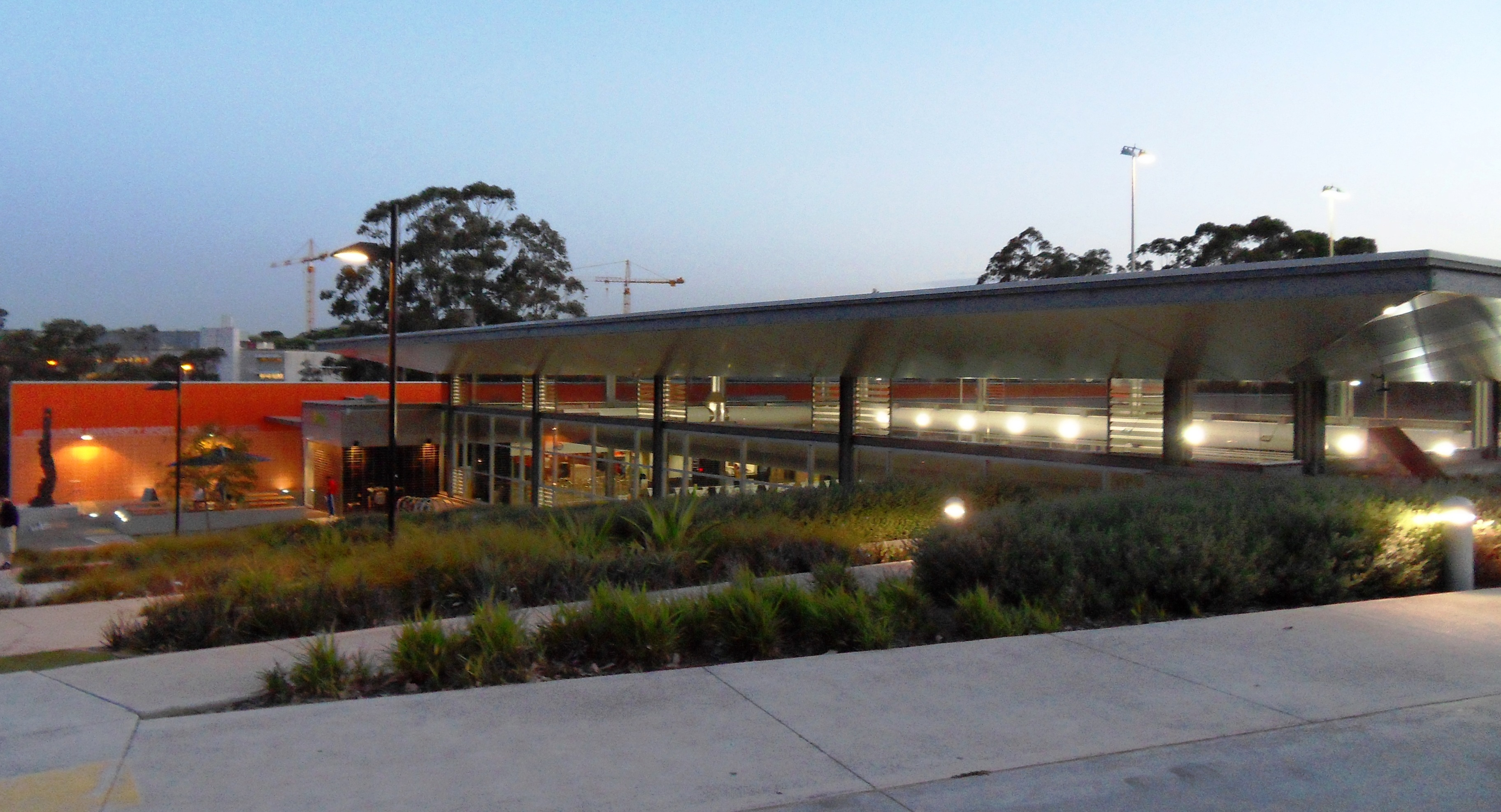
Macquarie University Sport and Aquatic Centre

The Macquarie University Sport and Aquatic Centre (MUSAC) is located on the western side of the Macquarie University main campus in Sydney, Australia. MUSAC serves the general public and the university community, providing venues and facilities for 14 university sporting clubs. The centre has also hosted the Sydney Kings basketball team, Sydney FC soccer team, Sydney Swans AFL team, Tennis Australia and the Australian National Swimming Team for training and preparation for international events.

The complex was greatly expanded at a cost of $17 million, opening in July 2007 adjacent to the existing sporting and gymnasium facilities. The expanded complex incorporates environmentally sustainable aspects including rainwater harvesting and strategically located orientation and shading devices, which had it nominated for a Royal Australian Institute of Architects award.

== Facilities ==
The centre's sports facilities include:

- 50 metre FINA-compliant outdoor competition pool, heated to 26-27 C
- 25 metre indoor programme pool, heated to 29-30 C
- Squash, badminton, basketball, volleyball and netball courts
- Full gymnasium and "cardio-theatre"
- Dedicated areas for a range of other exercises and sports including martial arts, cycling, yoga, personal training and fitness and lifestyle classes.
- The "Hall of Fame", Australia's first university sporting museum.

Outdoor facilities include:

- Sporting fields covering 7 hectares (17 acres) with parking and four change rooms
- Basketball and outdoor multi-sport Kopman courts
- 12 tennis courts

== Activities ==
MUSAC runs weekly social sport activities, and competitions in a variety of sports which can involve representing the university at a national or international level. Residential colleges compete in the Intercollege Challenge. There are also clubs devoted to individual sports that operate under the auspices of MUSAAC, including four different codes of football, cricket, squash, swimming, volleyball and water polo.

At a national level, the university competes as one of 43 universities under the umbrella of the UniSport Nationals.

MUSAC provides a range of classes (called "Group Fitness"), personal training, and swimming classes starting from babies at 6 months old up to national competition. There are also specific sports programmes, including gymnastics, various martial arts, and school holiday programs.

In recent years, the Centre has sought to broaden its appeal by incorporating non-traditional sports, with more emphasis on fun. One of the most bizarre to watch is a land-based version of the fictional game of quidditch, based on the game in the Harry Potter series of children's novels, where the University's "Mac Marauders" have gained media attention.

== History ==
When the University opened in 1964, it included a Sports Association with a one–room gym, two squash courts, and an annual budget of £6,000 ($12,000).

Initially known as the "Macquarie University Sports Association" (MUSA), it focussed on the needs of the university community, especially students. This was largely funded by compulsory student fees. This situation changed in 2007 when membership of student organizations became voluntary as part of the Voluntary student unionism legislation. The chief executive of Macquarie University Sport and Recreation at the time, Deidre Anderson, told the Sydney Morning Herald that clubs would need to become self-sufficient.

At this time, MUSA underwent a complete transformation: the old Sports Association organization was dissolved, along with the University Union and other student organizations – the university took direct control and set up a new "Campus Experience" organization as the umbrella for all services. The name "Macquarie University Sport & Aquatic Centre" (MUSAC) was coined for the newly established organization, coinciding with the extensive building programme, which included construction of the two swimming pools. The new centre had an increased focus on catering for the general community, to make up for the funding that previously came from students' compulsory fees.
