= Macquarie University Faculty of Arts =

Academic subdivision

Faculty of Arts
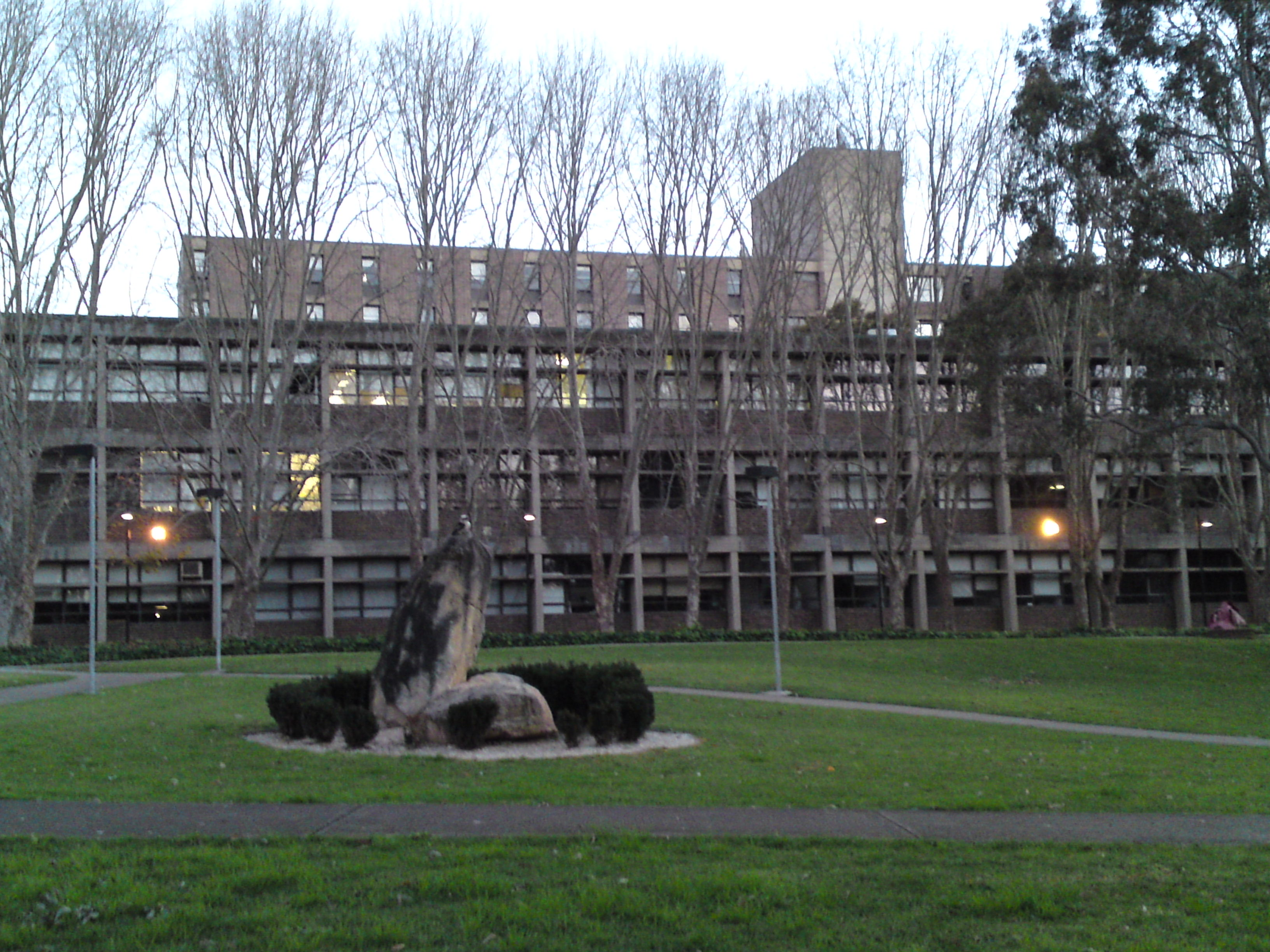
- Type: Public
- Established: 1964
- Affiliations: Macquarie University
- Dean: Chris Dixon (2026)
- Students: 30,249 (2021)
- Location: Sydney, New South Wales, Australia
- Campus: Urban
Colours
- Website: www.arts.mq.edu.au

The Faculty of Arts is a constituent body of Macquarie University, in Sydney, New South Wales, Australia. The faculty offers undergraduate and postgraduate coursework and research degree programmes and is home to a number of research centres. It ranked equal 101st–125 in the Times Higher Education 2022 university rankings.

== History ==
Macquarie University was established in 1964, and has grown to be a major public university.

=== New arts precinct ===
In April 2020 the Macquarie University Arts Precinct Project (MUAPP) was completed, an upgrade and expansion of existing buildings which consolidate ten departments into a cohesive precinct. It also created a new museum, incorporating the Ancient History Museum, numerous collections, Numismatics and the Australian History Museum. The new building incorporates an atrium with roofing "cushions" that give protection for the weather but allow natural light into the space.

The project won the Sydney Master Builders Association's Excellence in Construction Award, in the category Tertiary Buildings $100m–$200m.

The new building includes a huge video wall intended for student produced videos. The first video shown on it was commissioned by the university to sell their brand, created by Hank Mango. This video was entered in the Australian Effects and Animation Festival in 2022.

== Governance and structure ==
As of 2026 historian Chris Dixon, formerly dean of the Macquarie School of Social Sciences and before that head of the Department of Modern History, Politics and International Relations at the university, is dean of the faculty.

=== Departments and schools ===
As of 2026 the faculty comprises five departments and one center:

- Centre of Critical Indigenous Studies
- Macquarie Law School
- Macquarie School of Education
- School of Communication, Society and Culture
- School of Humanities
- School of International Studies

=== Research centres ===
As of 2026 the faculty's research centres include:

==== Macquarie University research centres ====
- Ethics and Agency Research Centre

==== Faculty research centres ====
- Australian Centre for Ancient Numismatic Studies (ACANS)
- Environmental Law Research Centre
- Global Indigenous Futures Research Centre
- Early Childhood Education Research Centre

== Ranking ==
In 2008, the faculty was ranked as 64th among the world's university arts and humanities departments.

The faculty ranked equal 101st–125 in the Times Higher Education 2022 university rankings.

== Students ==
In 2021, it had 30,249 students enrolled, of whom 30 per cent were international students. There is a staff-student ratio of 69.6 students to one staff member.

== Publications ==
=== Scan ===
Scan | Journal of Media Arts Culture was an inter-discliplinary peer-reviewed online journal published by the Department of Media, Music, Communications and Cultural Studies. Its subject matter covered "media studies, cultural studies, media law, information and technology studies, fine arts and philosophy... developments in new media, digital art, screen arts, music and audio arts, as well as the culture enveloping these practices and technologies". Founded in 2004 by John Potts, Sherman Young and Graham Meikle, its editorial board included academics from universities across Australia and as well as the United States and United Kingdom. It ceased publication after the Volume 11 Number 1 in 2014, but all of its issues are still available online.
