= Walter Abraham =

Australian town planner

Wally Abraham
- Born: Walter Victor Abraham; 1923; Kobe, Japan
- Died: 20 August 2006 (aged 82–83); Kiama, New South Wales, Australia
- Education: The University of Sydney
- Occupation: Architect
- Spouse: Felicity Prudence Abraham
- Projects: Macquarie University; University of the Philippines

Walter Victor "Wally" Abraham, BArch, DipTCP, ARAIA, FAPI (1923 – 20 August 2006) was an Australian architect and town planner, noted for designing the layout of the campus of Macquarie University, Sydney, Australia, as well as overseeing the first 20 years of its development.

== Early life ==
Walter Abraham was born in Kobe, Japan, and was descended from a prosperous Jewish family of merchants based in London, United Kingdom. His paternal grandfather travelled from England to Japan in 1868, where he established an import-export business in Kobe and eventually settled permanently, marrying a Japanese woman. Walter's father was born in Japan, but was educated at Dulwich College in London and, on his return to Japan to join the family business in Kobe, married a German woman from Hamburg.

Abraham initially followed in his father's footsteps, completing part of his education at Dulwich College. Mindful of the perils of being foreigners from an enemy state during wartime, in 1941 his parents moved from Japan to Australia and he completed his secondary education at Sydney Boys' High School.

== Career ==
=== World War II and early career ===
After leaving school, Abraham joined the Royal Australian Air Force and was seconded to a small intelligence unit which became known as AIRIND, composed of five Australians who could both speak and write Japanese. Their duties involved collecting and examining engines and parts from crashed Japanese aircraft, in order to deduce when and where they had been made. In the latter part of the war, the intelligence produced by AIRIND guided long-range bombing raids to attack factories involved in military production and thus hamper the Japanese war effort. In mid-1944 the unit was transferred to the control of the Pentagon, and was absorbed into the US war effort.

After the war, Abraham studied architecture and town planning at the University of Sydney. He then accepted a post with the now defunct Cumberland County Council. He later returned to Sydney University, where he lectured for five years on town planning. He also assisted with planning Sydney University's post-war expansion, until 1965.

=== Macquarie University ===
In 1964, Abraham was nominated as Architect Planner by a committee appointed to advise the New South Wales State Government on the establishment of a new university at North Ryde. He had previously written a report entitled Proposed University Site at North Ryde. Dated 5 June 1962, this is the first written record of his advice on the 135-hectare (330-acre) site, which was to be located around the intersection of Balaclava and Waterloo roads.

As part of his preliminary work in 1964, Abraham conducted a comprehensive photographic survey of the proposed campus site, which at that time was farmland. He wrote how he found

poultry farms; bare sun-crippled hardwood fences and small forests of tomato stakes; the rise and fall of Waterloo Road into a hazy distance; the slow plod of bowed back and short sleeves behind an iron plough and a white thick limbed horse; and everywhere distance, distance, distance.

In October 1964 it was decided that the university would open for teaching in early 1967, and would have a growth target of 1,000 new students each year for the following decade. The new Macquarie University Council decided that the planning of the campus would be conducted internally, rather than by consultants, and as such, an architect-planner's office was established.

Abraham was one of the first three staff members appointed to the university, and was also one of its first six administrators. He was appointed Architect Planner to the university in April 1965 and was given professorial status so that he could negotiate the university's development on an equal footing with the academic staff.

==== Campus design ====
At the time of his appointment, very little local information was available in Australia regarding the design and planning of universities, and so Abraham travelled to the United Kingdom and United States to study the works of contemporary university campus planners. Rejecting the perceived inflexibility of "master plans", a concept current at the time, he decided to aim for a balanced and flexible approach to developing the constructed and natural environments of the Macquarie site.

Abraham established a grid of lots of 300 square feet (approximately 28 square metres) each, aligned to points of the compass, split into three main divisions: West (W), Central (C), and East (E). Most of the principal buildings were to be constructed along or within easy reach of the campus's main west-east pedestrian way, which became known as University Walk. The measure of 300 feet was chosen as it was seen to represent a 1-minute walk, and Abraham wanted to aim for a design where no two points on campus were more than a maximum 10-minutes' walk from each other.

Sizeable parking areas were created on the outskirts of the academic core to the west, south and east, with traffic zones and bus routes running along the north and south of the main southern parking areas W1, C1, C2, and E1. Use of both natural hilly landscape and artificial mounds was made to ensure that the noise of cars and buses did not intrude into the academic area of the campus.

A valley on the north side of the academic area which overlooks the Lane Cove National Park was landscaped and kept free of buildings. The panorama was enhanced with the creation of a lake, and carefully designed planting programmes were commenced across campus. The beautiful grounds of Macquarie University today are essentially a product of Abraham's devotion to the art of landscape development.

Abraham remained in the employ of Macquarie University for 19 years, overseeing its development and enhancing the development's consistency. He retired in 1983, but remained a regular visitor and observed the continuing development of his creation with great interest.

=== Other career highlights ===
While he was still working at Macquarie, Abraham was involved in other significant projects. In 1968, he was appointed to report on a controversial proposal to widen Jersey Road in Paddington, New South Wales, which was being resisted by the local residents. Abraham added his professional weight to the argument, supporting the residents. This led to the proposal being scrapped.

In 1974, he wrote a report for UNESCO on physical planning at the University of the Philippines, which resulted in that university receiving loans for infrastructure development from the World Bank.

=== Retirement ===
After retiring from Macquarie University in 1983, Abraham and his wife Felicity moved to Kiama, New South Wales, 120 kilometres south of Sydney. Here he designed their house, which was sited on the eastern side of Saddleback Mountain. He became a local identity in the Illawarra region, often giving advice to the local authorities and was a constructive critic of the planning policies of the Kiama Municipal Council.

Macquarie University honoured Wally Abraham in 1991, when he was awarded the degree of Doctor of Science honoris causa.

In 2004 he attended the opening of the "Making it New" photographic exhibition, a part of Macquarie University's 40th anniversary celebrations which detailed the development of the campus. For a 40th anniversary article in Macquarie University's alumni magazine, Sirius, Abraham wrote

For its first 19 years, an in-house Architect-Planner’s Office conceived and coordinated Macquarie’s site development. Despite challenging deadlines, our superb site and a supportive Vice-Chancellor’s Office and Council ensured the establishment of an open-ended foundation for growth and change. No university could have been endowed with a more favourable beginning.

Abraham died on 20 August 2006, aged 82 (his wife Felicity Prudence Abraham had predeceased him in 1994). They are survived by their children Philip Abraham and Michaela Russell, Michaela's husband Terry Russell, and grandsons Nick and Ben. A motion put by the mayor of Kiama resulted in Wally Abraham being honoured in Council with a minute's silence on 19 September 2006.

In early 2006 it was announced that the main west-east pedestrian spine of the Macquarie University campus, formerly known as University Walk, and which had been undergoing extensive renovation and repaving would be renamed "Wally's Walk" in recognition of Dr Abraham, when it re-opened in April 2006.
