= Macquarie University =

Public university in Sydney, New South Wales, Australia

- Motto: Middle English: And gladly teche (Chaucer)
- Type: Public research university
- Established: 1964; 62 years ago
- Accreditation: TEQSA
- Budget: A$1.25 billion (2022)
- Visitor: Governor of New South Wales (ex officio)
- Chancellor: Martin Parkinson
- Vice-Chancellor: S Bruce Dowton
- Academic staff: 1,636 (FTE, 2023)
- Administrative staff: 1,948 (FTE, 2023)
- Total staff: 3,585 (FTE, 2023)
- Students: 44,015 (2023)
- Undergraduates: 33,184 (2023)
- Postgraduates: 8,785 (2023)
- Doctoral students: 1,331 (2023)
- Other students: 715 (2023)
- Location: Sydney, New South Wales, Australia; 33°46′31″S 151°06′46″E
- Campus: Suburban and parkland
- Named After: Lachlan Macquarie
- Colours: Maroon, red and black
- Sporting affiliations: UniSport; EAEN
- Mascot: MacWarrior
- Website: mq.edu.au

Macquarie University (/məˈkwɒri/ mə-KWORR-ee) is a public research university in Sydney, New South Wales, Australia. A research-intensive university, in 2023 it had 44,000 students.

The university's main campus is at Wallumattagal, in the Sydney suburb of Macquarie Park, which is served by Macquarie University railway station. There are four faculties: arts, business, medicine & health, and science & engineering, plus the Macquarie University Hospital.

It was founded in 1964 by the New South Wales Government, as the third university to be established in the Sydney metropolitan area. It is one of the five verdant universities located in Australian state capitals. It is named after Lachlan Macquarie, the Governor of New South Wales from 1810 to 1821.

== History ==
=== 20th century ===
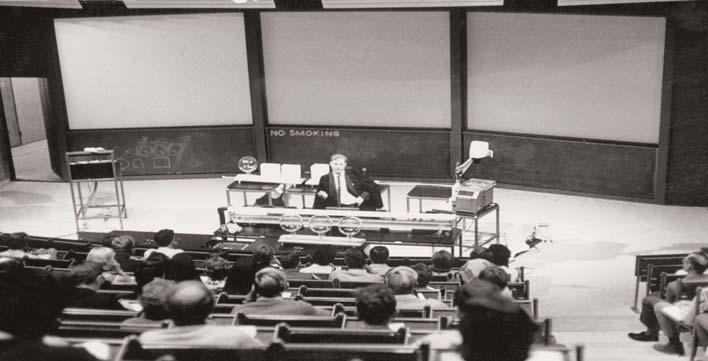
Peter Mason delivers first lecture

The idea of founding a third university in Sydney was flagged in the early 1960s when the New South Wales Government formed a committee of enquiry into higher education to deal with a perceived emergency in university enrolments in New South Wales. During this enquiry, the Senate of the University of Sydney put in a submission which highlighted 'the immediate need to establish a third university in the metropolitan area'. After much debate a future campus location was selected in what was then a semi-rural part of North Ryde, and it was decided that the future university be named after Lachlan Macquarie, an important early governor of the colony of New South Wales.

Macquarie University was formally established in 1964 with the passage of the Macquarie University Act 1964 by the New South Wales parliament.

The initial concept of the campus was to create a new high-technology corridor, similar to the area surrounding Stanford University in Palo Alto, California, the goal being to provide for interaction between industry and the new university. The academic core was designed in the Brutalist style and developed by the town planner Walter Abraham who also oversaw the next 20 years of planning and development for the university. A committee appointed to advise the state government on the establishment of the new university at North Ryde nominated Abraham as the architect-planner. The fledgling Macquarie University Council decided that planning for the campus would be done within the university, rather than by consultants, and this led to the establishment of the architect-planners office.

The first vice-chancellor of Macquarie University, Alexander George Mitchell, was selected by the University Council which met for the first time on 17 June 1964. Members of the first university council included: Colonel Sir Edward Ford OBE, David Paver Mellor, Rae Else-Mitchell QC and Sir Walter Scott.

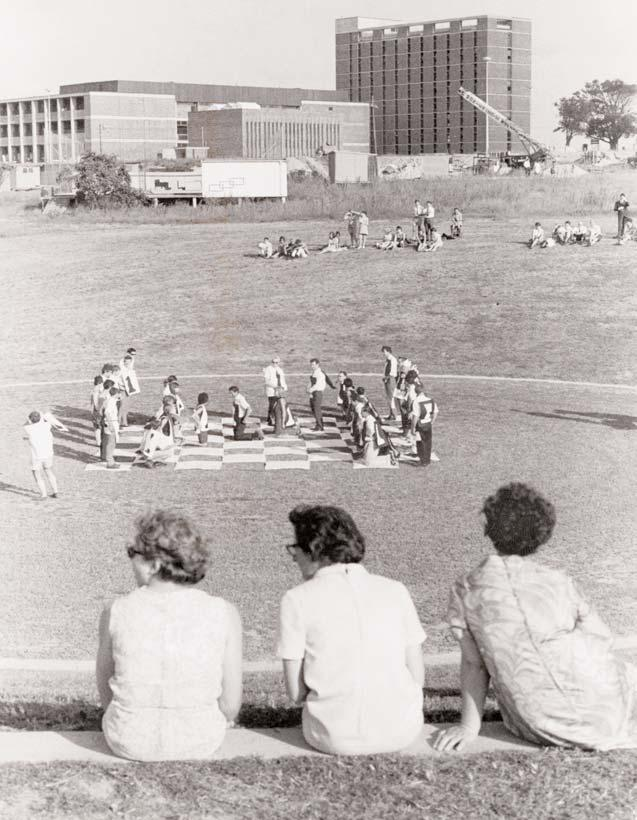
First students at Macquarie University

The university first opened to students on 6 March 1967 with more students than anticipated. The Australian Universities Commission had allowed for 510 effective full-time students (EFTS) but Macquarie had 956 enrolments and 622 EFTS. Between 1968 and 1969, enrolment at Macquarie increased dramatically with an extra 1200 EFTS, with 100 new academic staff employed. 1969 also saw the establishment of the Macquarie Graduate School of Management (MGSM).

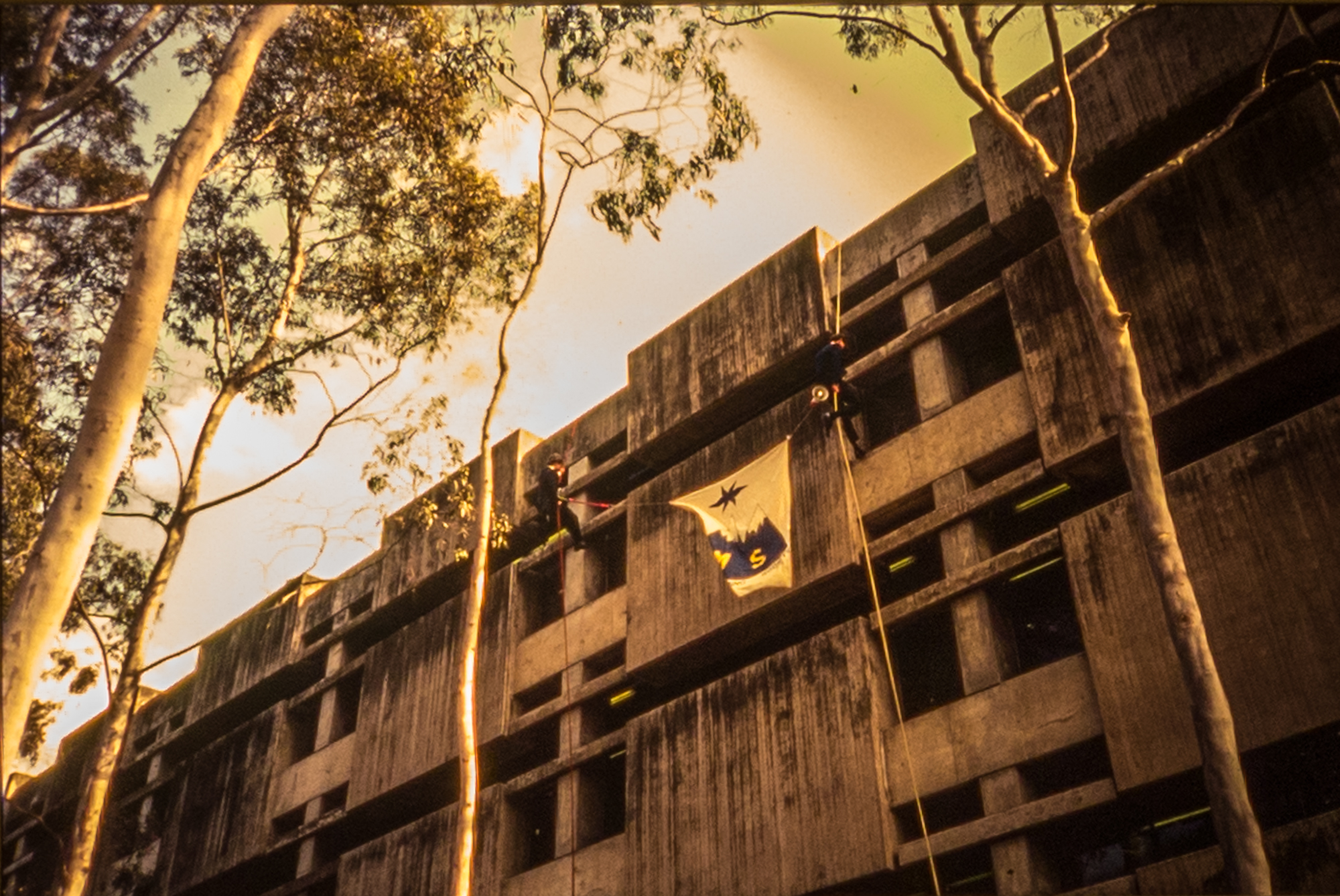
Macquarie University Library 1993, scaled by members of the Macquarie University Mountaineering Society during O-Week.

Macquarie grew during the seventies and eighties with rapid expansion in courses offered, student numbers and development of the site. In 1972, the university established the Macquarie Law School, the third law school in Sydney. In their book Liberality of Opportunity, Bruce Mansfield and Mark Hutchinson describe the founding of Macquarie University as 'an act of faith and a great experiment'. An additional topic considered in this book is the science reform movement of the late 1970s that resulted in the introduction of a named science degree, thus facilitating the subsequent inclusion of other named degrees in addition to the traditional BA. An alternative view on this topic is given by theoretical physicist John Ward.

In 1973, the student union (MUSC) worked with the Builders Labourers Federation (BLF) to organise one of the first "pink bans". Similar in tactic to the green ban, the pink ban was recommended when one of the residential colleges at Macquarie University, Robert Menzies College, ordered a student to lead a celibate life and undertake therapy and confession to cure himself of his homosexuality. The BLF decided to stop all construction work at the college until the university and the college Master made statements committing to a non-discriminatory university environment. MUSC was successful in engaging with the BLF again in 1974 when a woman at Macquarie University had her NSW Department of Education scholarship cancelled on the basis that she was a lesbian and therefore unfit to be a teacher.

After over a decade of service, the first vice-chancellor Mitchell was succeeded by Edwin C. Webb in December 1975. Webb was required to steer the university through one of its most difficult periods as the value of universities were debated and the governments introduced significant funding cuts. Webb left the university in 1986 and was succeeded by Di Yerbury, the first female vice-chancellor in Australia. Yerbury would go on to hold the position of vice-chancellor for nearly 20 years.

In 1990, the university absorbed the Institute of Early Childhood Studies of the Sydney College of Advanced Education, under the Higher Education (Amalgamation) Act 1989.

=== 21st century ===
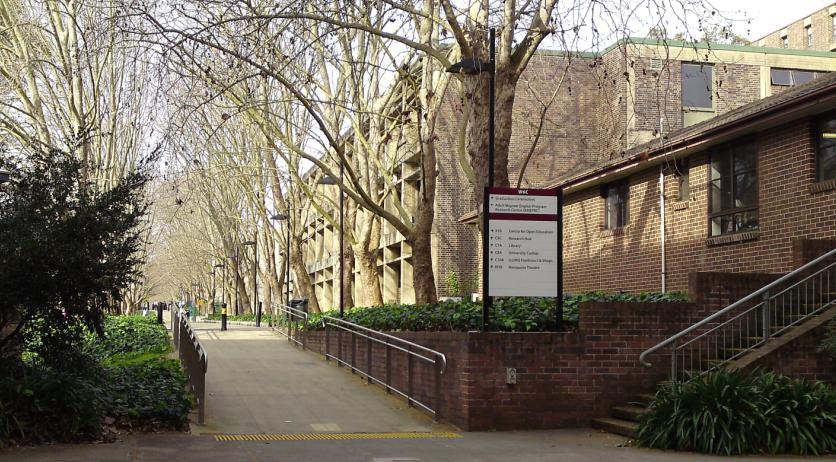
Wally's Walk

Steven Schwartz replaced Di Yerbury as vice-chancellor at the beginning of 2006. Yerbury's departure was attended with much controversy, including a "bitter dispute" with Schwartz, disputed ownership of university artworks worth $13 million and Yerbury's salary package. In August 2006, Schwartz expressed concern about the actions of Yerbury in a letter to university auditors. Yerbury strongly denied any wrongdoing and claimed the artworks were hers.

During 2007, Macquarie University restructured its student organisation after an audit raised questions about management of hundreds of thousands of dollars in funds by student organisations At the centre of the investigation was Victor Ma, president of the Macquarie University Students' Council, who was previously involved in a high-profile case of student election fixing at the University of Sydney. The university Council resolved to immediately remove Ma from his position. Vice-chancellor Schwartz cited an urgent need to reform Macquarie's main student bodies. However, Ma strongly denied any wrongdoing and labelled the controversy a case of 'character assassination'. The Federal Court ordered on 23 May 2007 that Macquarie University Union Ltd be wound up.

Following the dissolution of Macquarie University Union Ltd, the outgoing student organisation was replaced with a new wholly owned subsidiary company of the university, known as U@MQ Ltd. The new student organisation originally lacked a true student representative union; however, following a complete review and authorisation from the university Council, a new student union known as Macquarie University Students Association (MUSRA) was established in 2009.

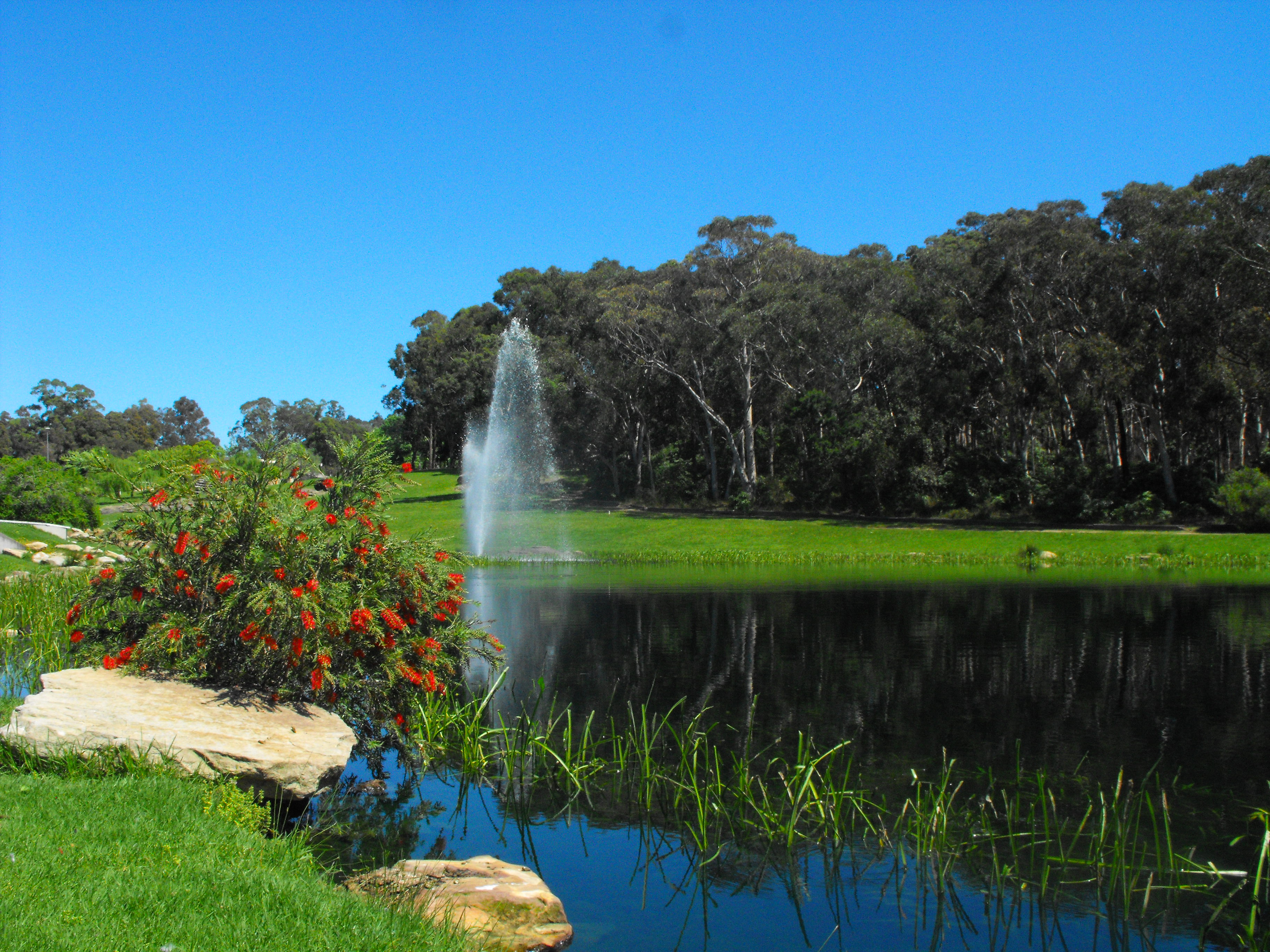
Parklands at the university

Within the first few hundred days of Schwartz's instatement as vice-chancellor, the 'Macquarie@50' strategic plan was launched, which positioned the university to enhance research, teaching, infrastructure and academic rankings by the university's 50th anniversary in 2014. Included in the university's plans for the future was the establishment of a sustainability office in order to more effectively manage environmental and social development at Macquarie. As part of this campaign, in 2009 Macquarie became the first Fair Trade accredited university in Australia. The beginning of 2009 also saw the introduction of a new logo for the university which retained the Sirius Star, present on both the old logo and the university crest, but now 'embedded in a stylised lotus flower'. In accordance with the university by-law, the crest continues to be used for formal purposes and is displayed on university testamurs. The by-law also prescribes the university's motto, taken from Chaucer: 'And gladly teche'.

In 2013, the university became the first in Australia to fully align its degree system with the Bologna Accord.

== Campuses and buildings ==
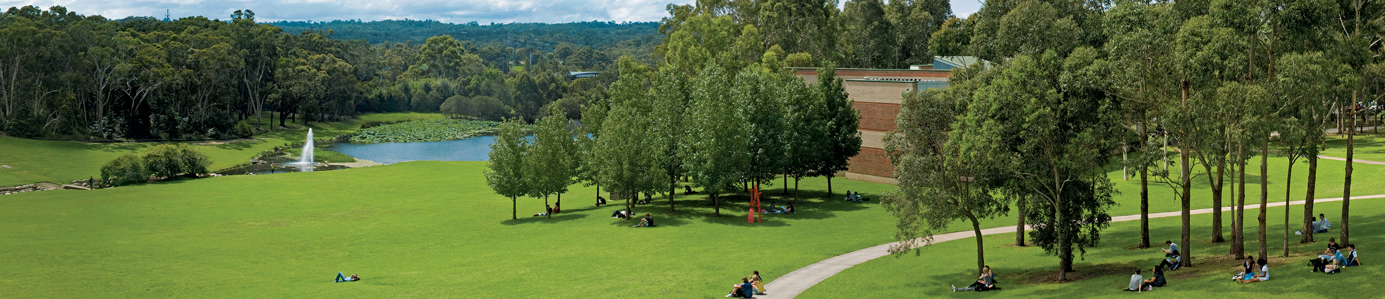
University Lake, a popular spot for students

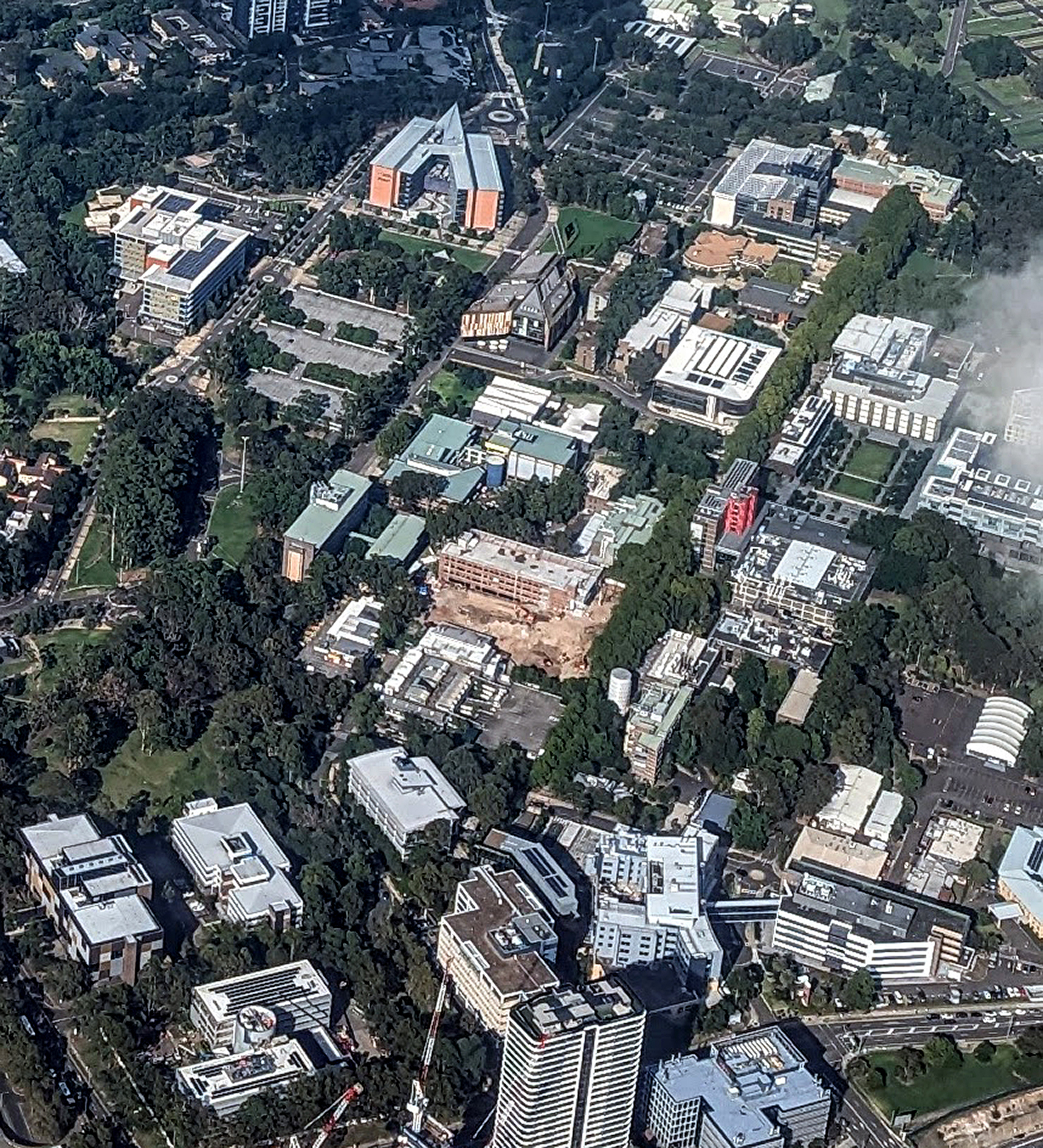
Aerial view of the campus, looking west

Macquarie University's main campus is about 16 kilometres (9.9 mi) north-west of the Sydney CBD and is set on 126 hectares of rolling lawns and natural bushland. Macquarie's location within the high-technology corridor of Sydney's north-west, in close proximity to Macquarie Park and its surrounding industries, has been crucial in its development as a relatively research intensive university.

Before the development of the campus, most of the site was cultivated with peach orchards, market gardens and poultry farms. The university's first architect-planner was Walter Abraham, one of the first six administrators appointed to Macquarie University. As the site adapted from its former rural use to a busy collegiate environment, he implemented carefully designed planting programs across the campus. Abraham established a grid design comprising lots of 300 square feet (28 m^{2}) running north–south, with the aim of creating a compact academic core. The measure of 300 feet (91 m) was seen as one minute's walk, and grid design reflected the aim of having a maximum walk of 10 minutes between any two parts of the university. The main east–west walkway that runs from the Macquarie University Research Park to the arts faculty buildings was named Wally's Walk in recognition of Abraham's contribution.

Apart from its centres of learning, the campus features the Macquarie University Research Park, museums, art galleries, a sculpture park, an observatory, a sport and aquatic centre and the private Macquarie University Hospital. The campus has its own postcode, 2109.

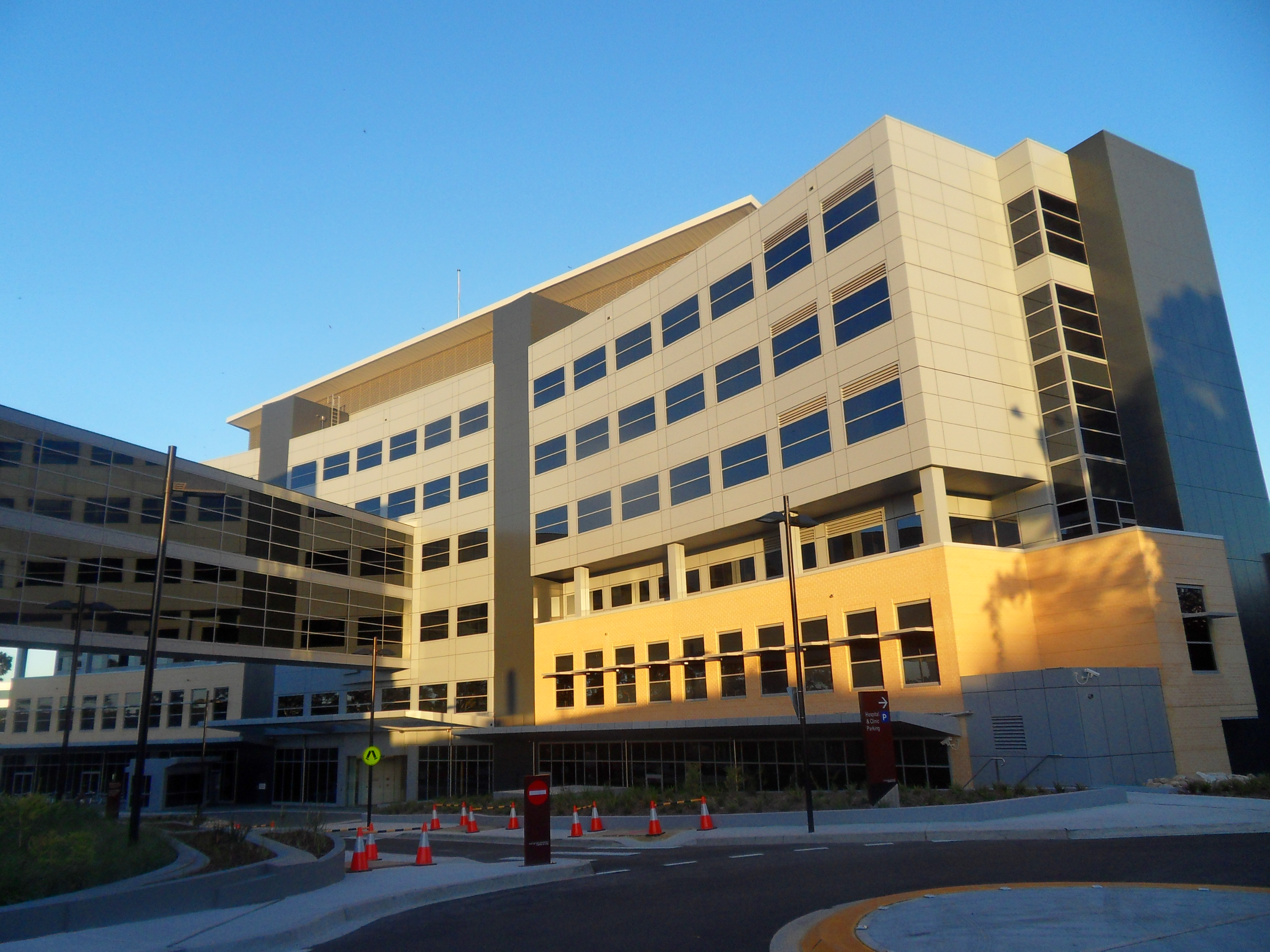
Macquarie University Hospital

=== Macquarie University Hospital ===
Macquarie became the first university in Australia to own and operate a private medical facility in 2010 when it opened a $300 million hospital on its campus. The hospital is the first and only private not-for-profit teaching hospital on an Australian university campus. The Macquarie University Hospital is north of the main campus area towards the university sports grounds. It comprises 183 beds, 13 operating theatres, 2 cardiac and vascular angiography suites. The hospital is co-located with the university's Australian School of Advanced Medicine.

=== Commercial use ===
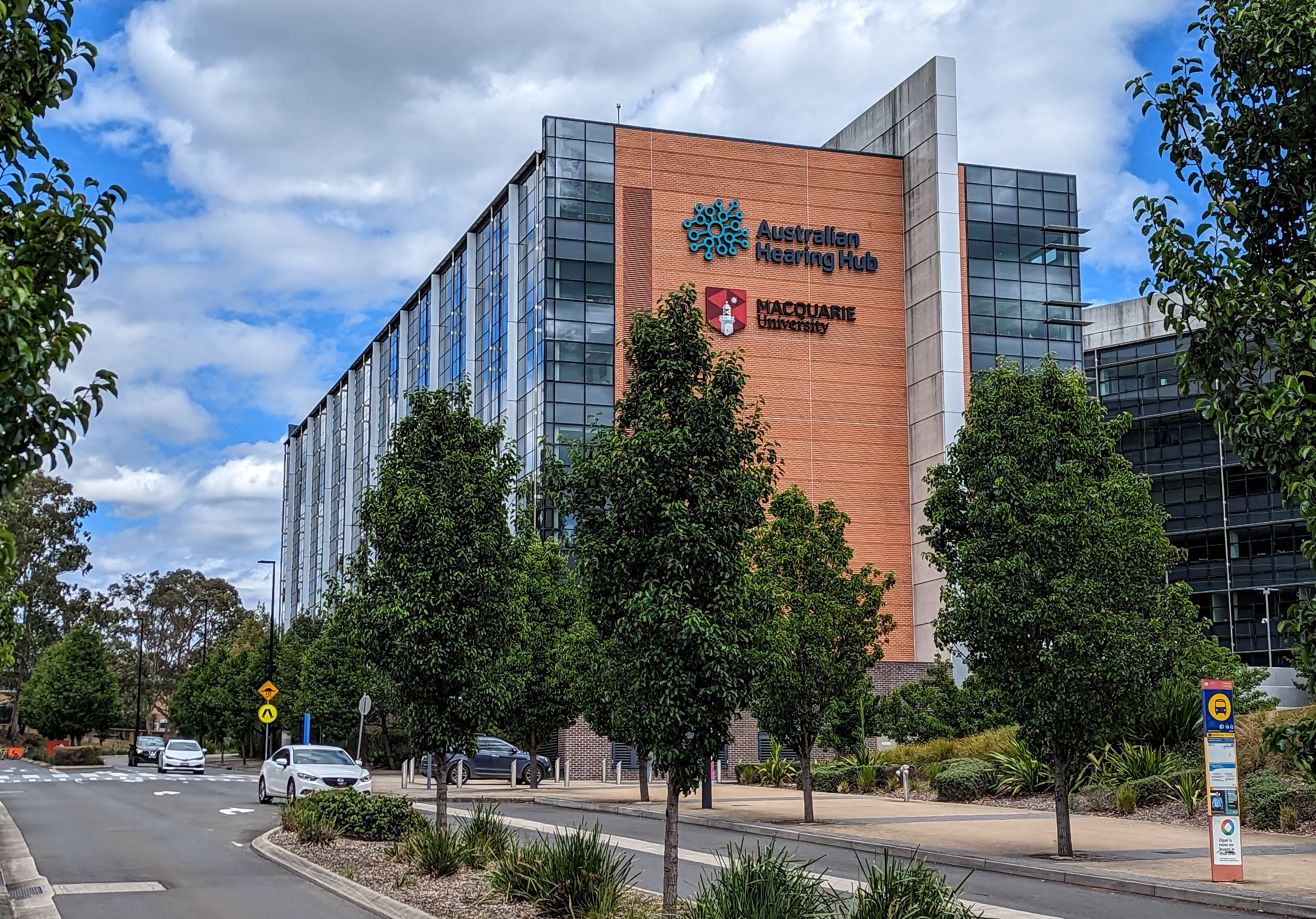
The Australian Hearing Hub building at Macquarie University

The university hosts a number of high-technology companies on its campus. Primarily designed to encourage interaction between the university and industry, commercialisation of its campus has also given the institution an additional revenue stream. Tenants are selected based on their potential to collaborate with the university's researches or their ability to provide opportunities for its students and graduates. Cochlear has its headquarters in close proximity to the Australian Hearing Hub on the southern edge of campus. Other companies that have office space at the campus include Dow Corning, Goodman Fielder, Nortel, OPSM, and Siemens.

The Macquarie University Observatory was originally constructed in 1978 as a research facility but since 1997 has been accessible to the public through its Public Observing Program.

== Governance and structure ==
=== University Council ===
The university is governed by a 17-member Council.

The University Council is the governing authority of the university under the Macquarie University Act 1989.

The council has primary responsibility for the control and management of the affairs of the university, and is empowered to make by-laws and rules relating to how the university is managed. Members of the council include the university vice-chancellor, academic and non-academic staff, the vice president of the Academic Senate and a student representative. The council is chaired by the chancellor of the university.

The Academic Senate is the primary academic body of the university. It has certain powers delegated to it by the council, such as the approving of examination results and the completion of requirements for the award of degrees. At the same time, it makes recommendations to the council concerning all changes to degree rules and all proposals for new awards. It elects its own chair (vice president).

==== Chancellor and Vice-Chancellor ====
Macquarie's current vice-chancellor, Bruce Dowton, took over from Schwartz in September 2012. Prior to his appointment Dowton served as a senior medical executive, having held a range of positions in university, healthcare and consulting organisations. He also served as a pediatrician at the Massachusetts General Hospital for Children, and as Clinical Professor of Pediatrics at Harvard Medical School. There have been five vice-chancellors in the university's history.

=== Faculties and departments ===
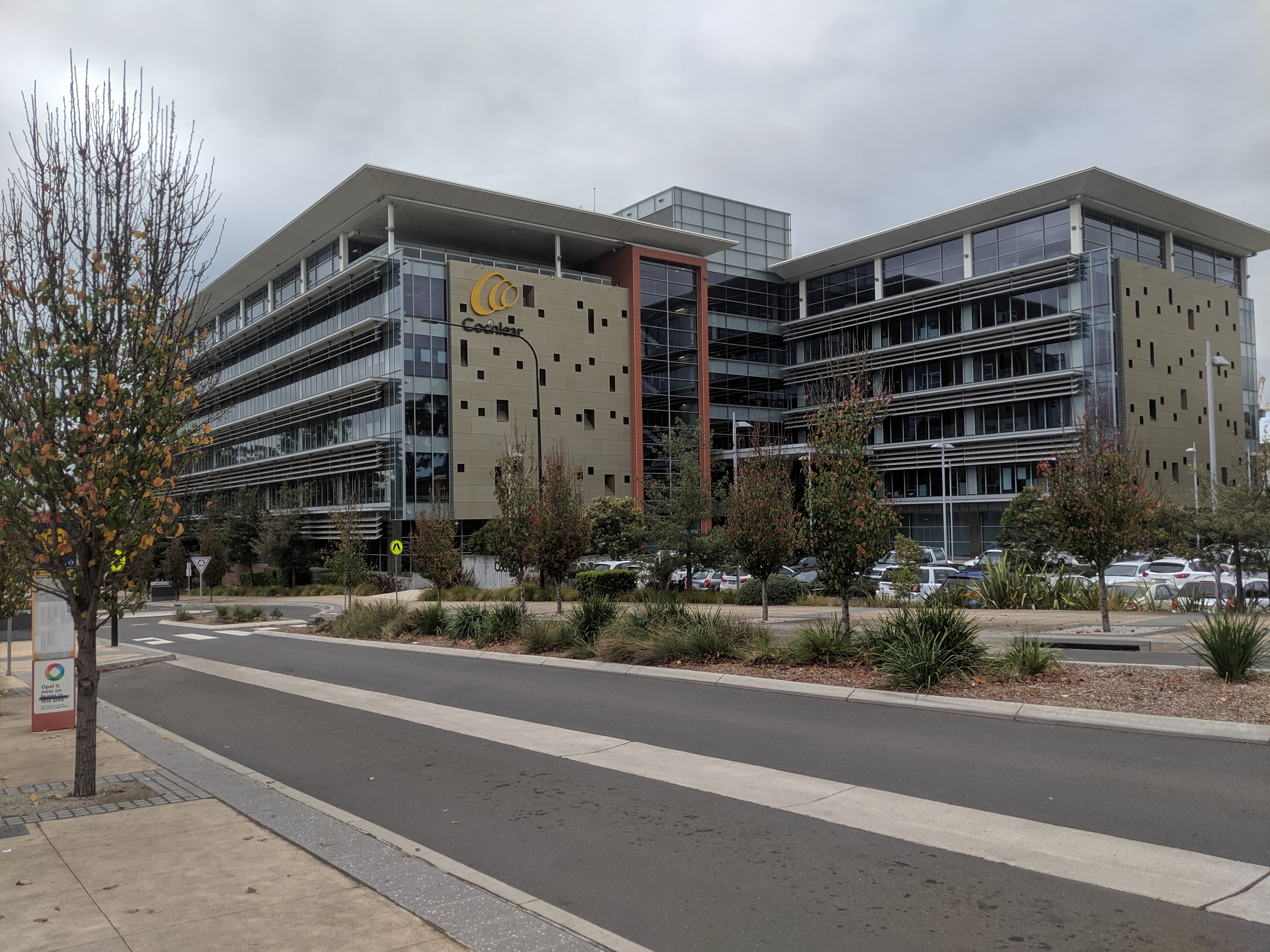
Cochlear Building

The university currently comprises 35 departments within four faculties:

- Faculty of Arts
- Macquarie Business School
- Faculty of Medicine and Health Sciences
- Faculty of Science and Engineering

The coat of arms of Lachlan Macquarie, as granted to the university by the Lord Lyon King of Arms in 1967.

=== Heraldry and insignia ===
==== Coat of arms ====
Macquarie University's coat of arms (often erroneously referred to as a 'crest') was assumed through a 1967 amendment of the Macquarie University Act, 1964 (Confirmed by Letters patent of the College of Arms, 16 August 1969), and the Grant of arms reads:

Vert, the Macquarie lighthouse tower, masoned proper, in Chief the star Sirius, Or.

The escutcheon (in green taken from the tartan of Clan MacQuarrie) displays the Macquarie Lighthouse tower, the first major public building in the colony when completed in 1816, as well as the Sirius star (in gold), which was also the name of the flagship of the First Fleet. The motto chosen for the university, which following the rules of English heraldry does not form part of the original grant of arms, was And Gladly Teche, a phrase taken from the general prologue of The Canterbury Tales by Geoffrey Chaucer (circa 1400), and symbolises the university's commitment to both learning and teaching.

The university's founders originally wanted to base the university's arms on Lachlan Macquarie's family arms, but they decided to go for a more conceptual approach that represented Lachlan Macquarie as a builder and administrator. They did however identify that the arms used by Governor Macquarie had never been formally granted by the Court of the Lord Lyon in Scotland, and was successful in having a grant of arms issued for Macquarie by the Lord Lyon King of Arms, as well as the right to display his arms. These arms, along with the new arms of the university, were formally unveiled on 31 May 1967 by the chancellor, Sir Garfield Barwick.

The coat of arms and the motto are used in a very limited number of formal communications.

==== Branding ====
Macquarie has had a number of logos in its history. In 2014, the university launched a new logo as part of its Shared Identity Project. The logo reintroduced the Macquarie Lighthouse, a popular symbol of the university within the university community and maintained the Sirus Star.

== Academic profile ==
=== Research and publications ===
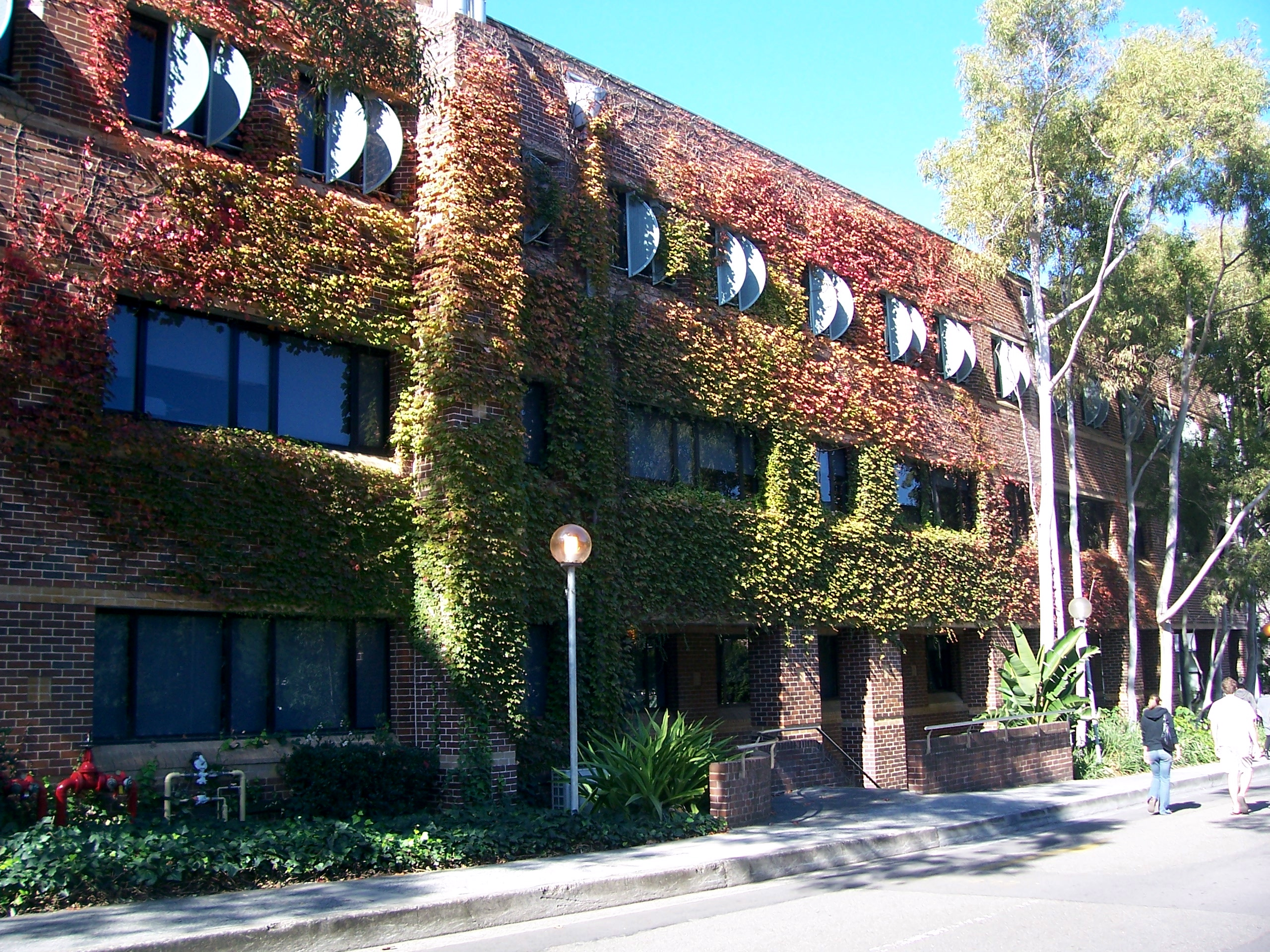
Computer Science building

The university positions itself as being research intensive. In 2012, 85% of Macquarie's broad fields of research was rated 'at or above world standard' in the Excellence in Research for Australia 2012 National report. The university is within the top 3 universities in Australia for the number of peer-reviewed publications produced per academic staff member.

Researchers at Macquarie University, David Skellern and Neil Weste, and the Commonwealth Scientific and Industrial Research Organisation helped develop Wi-Fi. David Skellern has been a major donor to the university through the Skellern Family Trust. Macquarie physicists Frank Duarte and Jim Piper pioneered the laser designs adopted by researchers worldwide, in various major national programs, for atomic vapor laser isotope separation.

Macquarie University's linguistics department developed the Macquarie Dictionary. The dictionary is regarded as the standard reference on Australian English.

Macquarie University has a research partnership with the University of Hamburg in Germany and Fudan University in China. They offer dual and joint degree programs and engage in joint research.

Access Macquarie Limited was established in 1989 as the commercial arm of the university. It facilitates and supports the commercial needs of industry, business and government organisations seeking to utilise the academic expertise of the broader university community.

=== Research divisions ===
Research centres, schools and institutes that are affiliated with the university:

- The Australian Research Institute for Environment and Sustainability
- The Macquarie University Hospital
- The Australian Hearing Hub

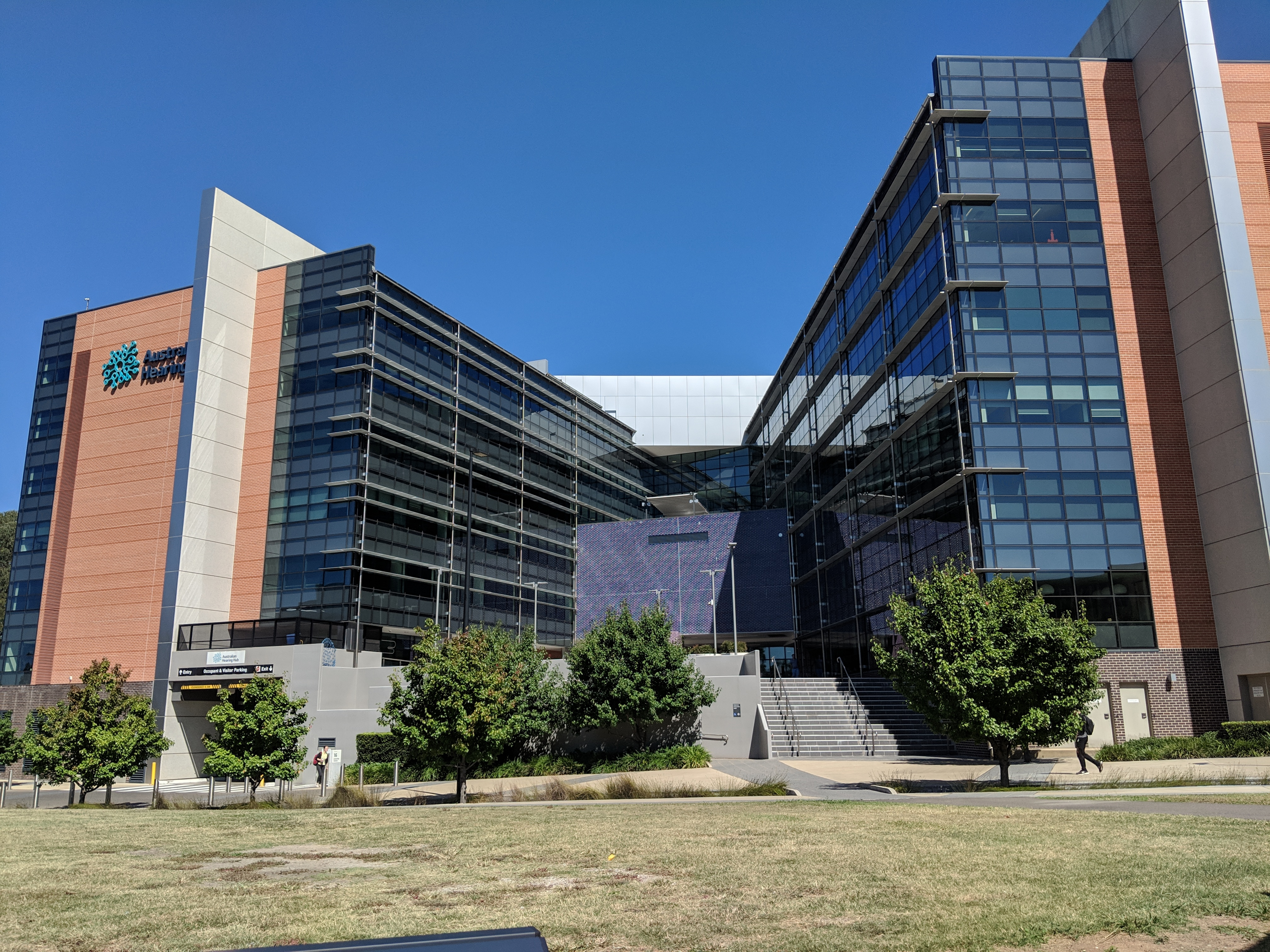
Australian Hearing Hub

Macquarie University's Australian Hearing Hub is partnered with Cochlear. Cochlear Headquarters are on campus. The Australian Hearing Hub includes the head office of Australian Hearing.

The Australian Research Institute for Environment and Sustainability is a research centre that promotes change for environmental sustainability, is affiliated with the university and is located on its campus.

=== Library and archives ===
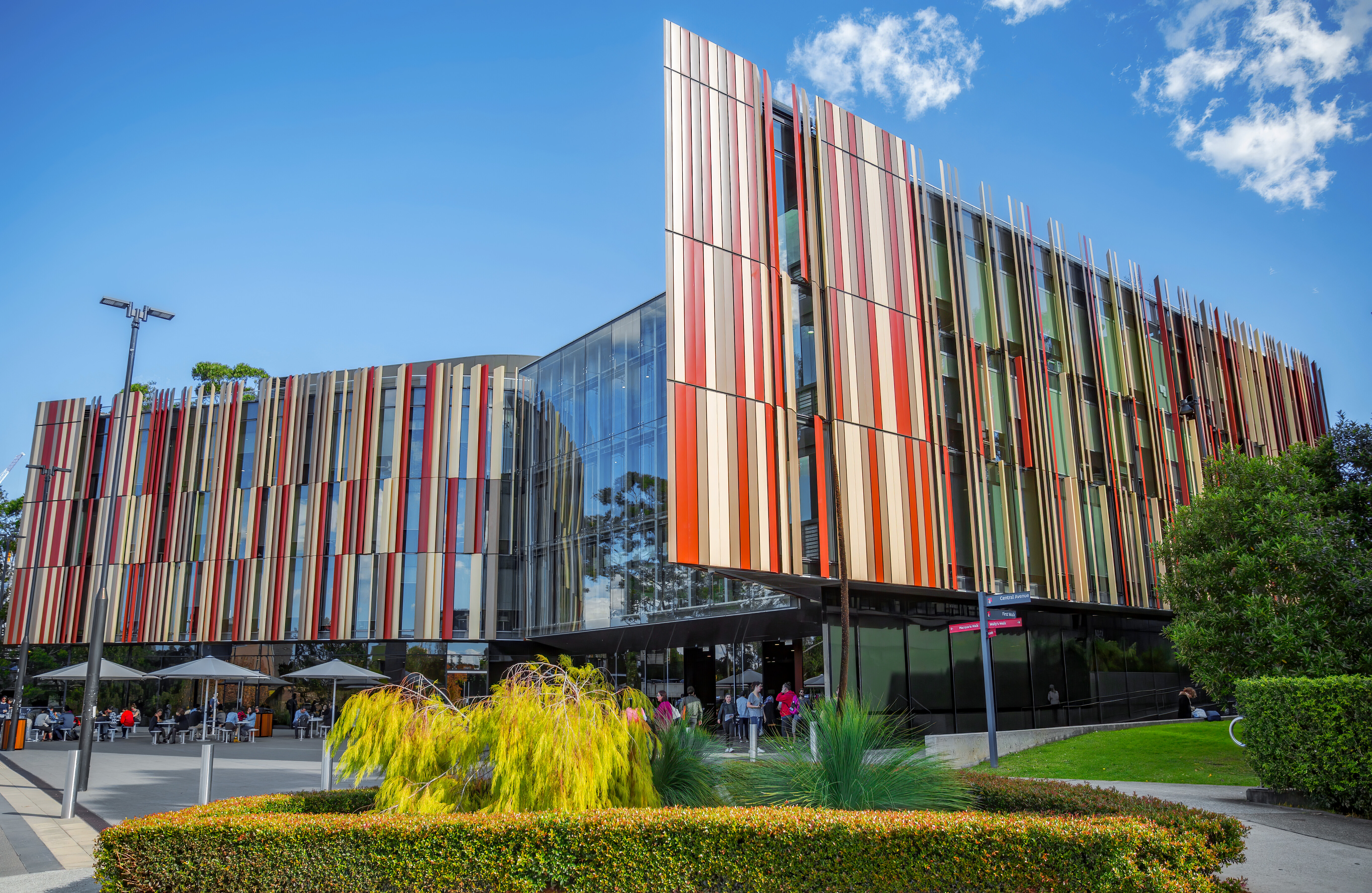
Waranara Library

The library houses over 1.8 million items and uses the Library of Congress Classification System. It has several collections, including a Rare Book Collection, a Palaeontology Collection and the Brunner Collection of Egyptological materials. The original library in building C7A, opened in 1967, closed in July 2011 (the building has been repurposed as a student support and study space) and a new library, in building C3C, became fully operational on 1 August 2011. The new library was Australia's first university library to possess an automated storage and retrieval system (ASRS). The ASRS consists of an environmentally controlled vault with metal bins storing the items; robotic cranes retrieve an item on request and deliver it to the service desk for collection.

=== Museums and collections ===
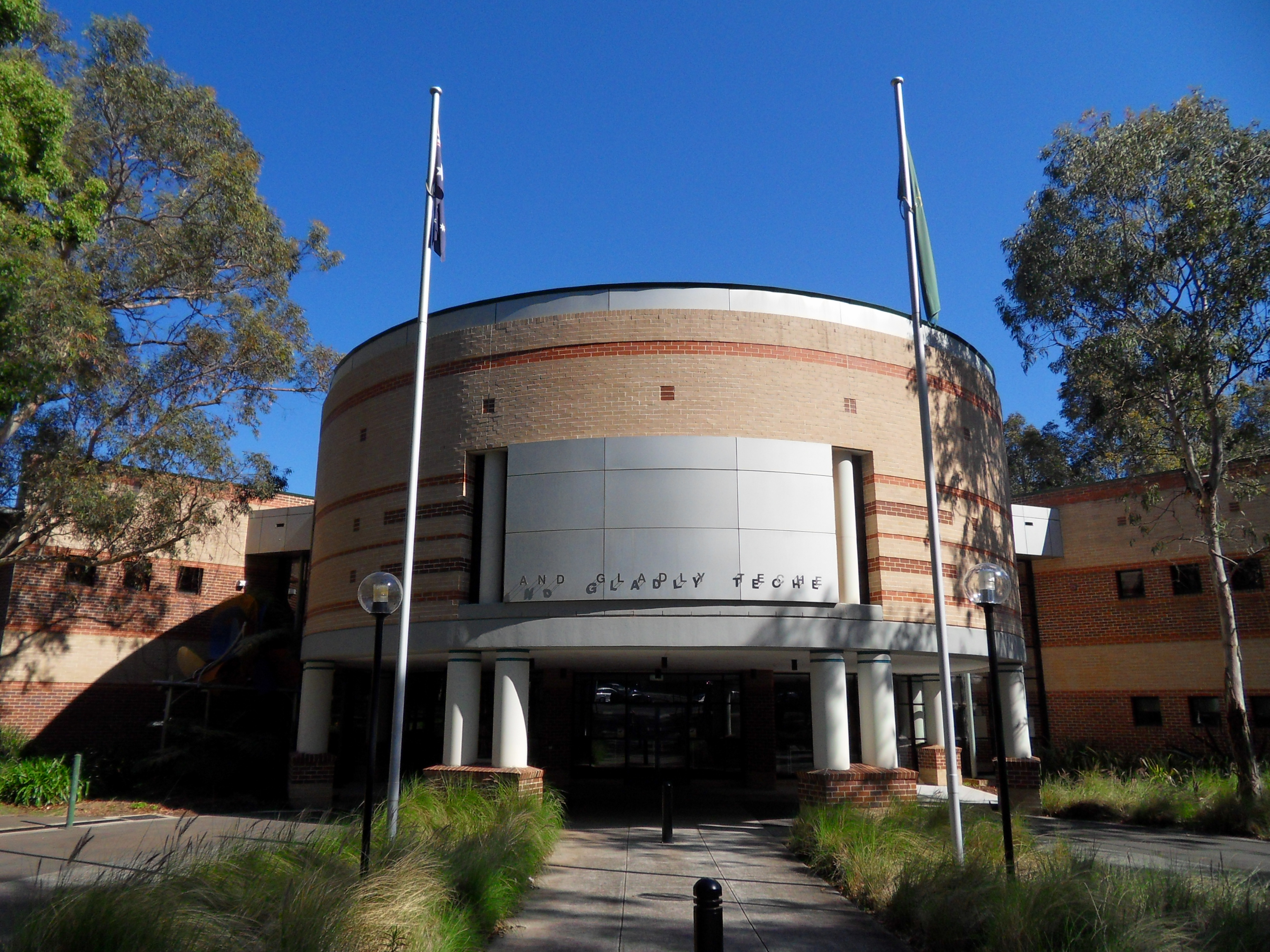
Macquarie University Art Gallery

The museums and collections of Macquarie University include nine museums and galleries. Each collection focuses on various historical, scientific or artistic interests. The most visible collection on campus is the sculpture park, which is exhibited across the entire campus; at close to 100 sculptures on display, it is the largest park of its kind in the Southern Hemisphere. All museums and galleries are open to the public and offer educational programs for students at primary, secondary and tertiary levels.

=== Other sub-units ===
==== Start-up incubator ====
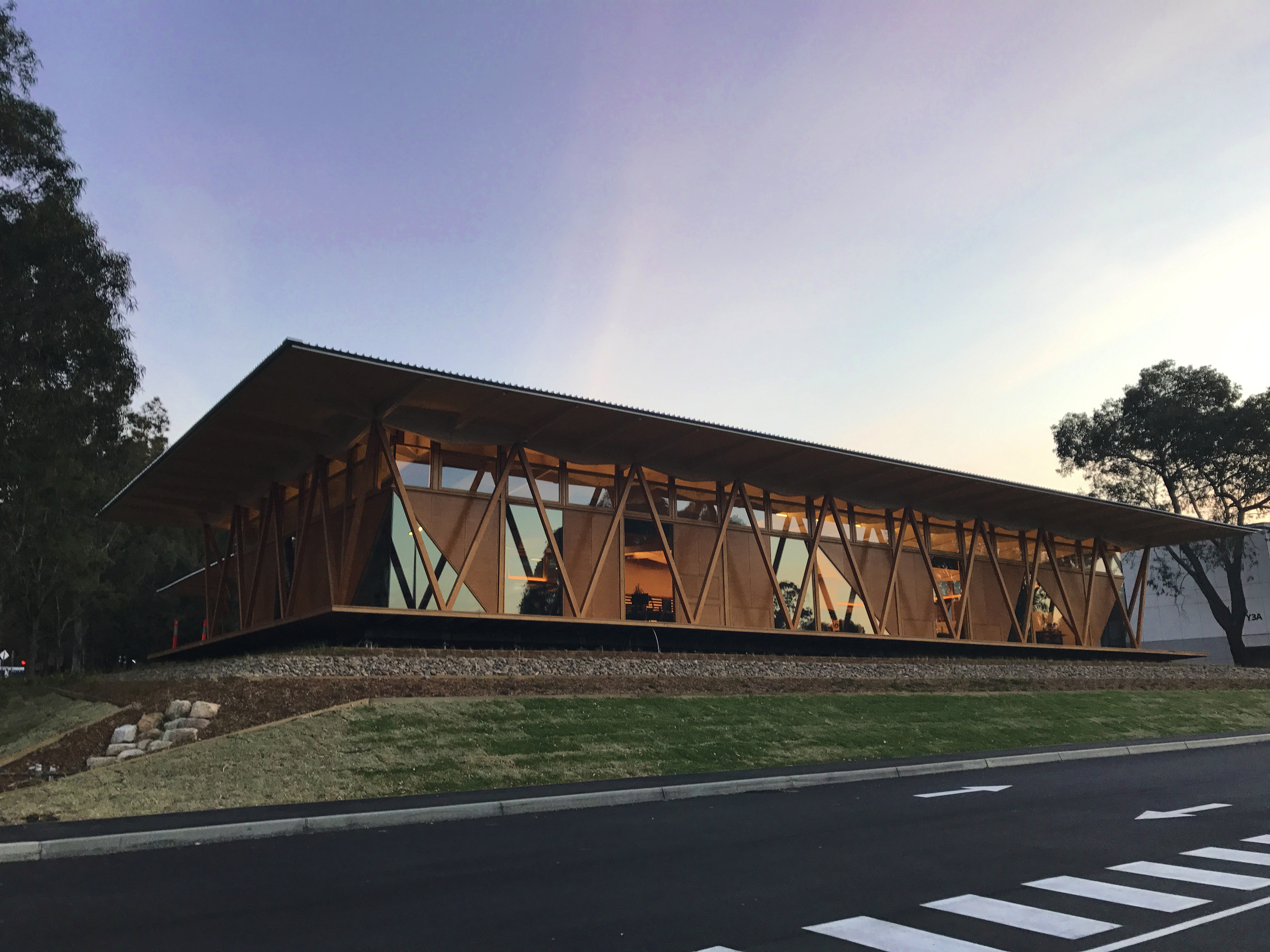
Macquarie University Incubator

The Macquarie University Incubator is a space to research and develop ideas that can be commercialised. It was established in 2017 as a part of the Macquarie Park Innovation District (MPID) project. Macquarie University received a $1 million grant from the New South Wales government to build the incubator. The university has also committed about $7 million to the incubator with financial support of the big businesses and the New South Wales government. It was officially opened by Prince Andrew, Duke of York on 25 September 2017.

=== Academic reputation ===
University rankings

Global – Overall
- ARWU World: 201–300 (2025)
- CWTS World: 291 (Note: The CWTS Leiden Ranking is based on P (top 10%).) (2024)
- QS World: =138 (2026)
- QS Employability: 98 (2022)
- THE World: =166 (2026)
- USNWR Global: =178 (25/26)

National – Overall
- ARWU National: 9–13 (2025)
- CWTS National: 14 (2024)
- QS National: 11 (2026)
- THE National: 9 (2026)
- USNWR National: 12 (25/26)
- AFR National: 13 (2025)

In the 2024 Aggregate Ranking of Top Universities, which measures aggregate performance across the QS, THE and ARWU rankings, the university attained a position of #168 (10th nationally).

National publications

In the Australian Financial Review Best Universities Ranking 2025, the university was ranked #13 amongst Australian universities.

Global publications

In the 2026 Quacquarelli Symonds World University Rankings (published 2025), the university attained a tied position of #138 (11th nationally).

In the Times Higher Education World University Rankings 2026 (published 2025), the university attained a tied position of #166 (9th nationally).

In the 2025 Academic Ranking of World Universities, the university attained a position of #201–300 (9–13th nationally).

In the 2025–2026 U.S. News & World Report Best Global Universities, the university attained a tied position of #178 (12th nationally).

In the CWTS Leiden Ranking 2024, the university attained a position of #291 (14th nationally).

=== Student outcomes ===
The Australian Government's QILT (Note: Abbreviation for Quality Indicators for Learning and Teaching.) conducts national surveys documenting the student life cycle from enrolment through to employment. These surveys place more emphasis on criteria such as student experience, graduate outcomes and employer satisfaction than perceived reputation, research output and citation counts.

In the 2023 Employer Satisfaction Survey, graduates of the university had an overall employer satisfaction rate of 83.5%.

In the 2023 Graduate Outcomes Survey, graduates of the university had a full-time employment rate of 78.7% for undergraduates and 87.3% for postgraduates. The initial full-time salary was A$70,000 for undergraduates and A$95,000 for postgraduates.

In the 2023 Student Experience Survey, undergraduates at the university rated the quality of their entire educational experience at 76.4% meanwhile postgraduates rated their overall education experience at 78.2%.

=== Admissions ===
==== International ====
The Macquarie University International College offers Foundation Studies (Pre-University) and University-level Diplomas. Upon successful completion of a MUIC Diploma, students enter the appropriate bachelor's degree as a second year student.

The Centre for Macquarie English is the English-language centre that offers a range of specialised, direct entry English programs that are approved by Macquarie University.

== Student life ==
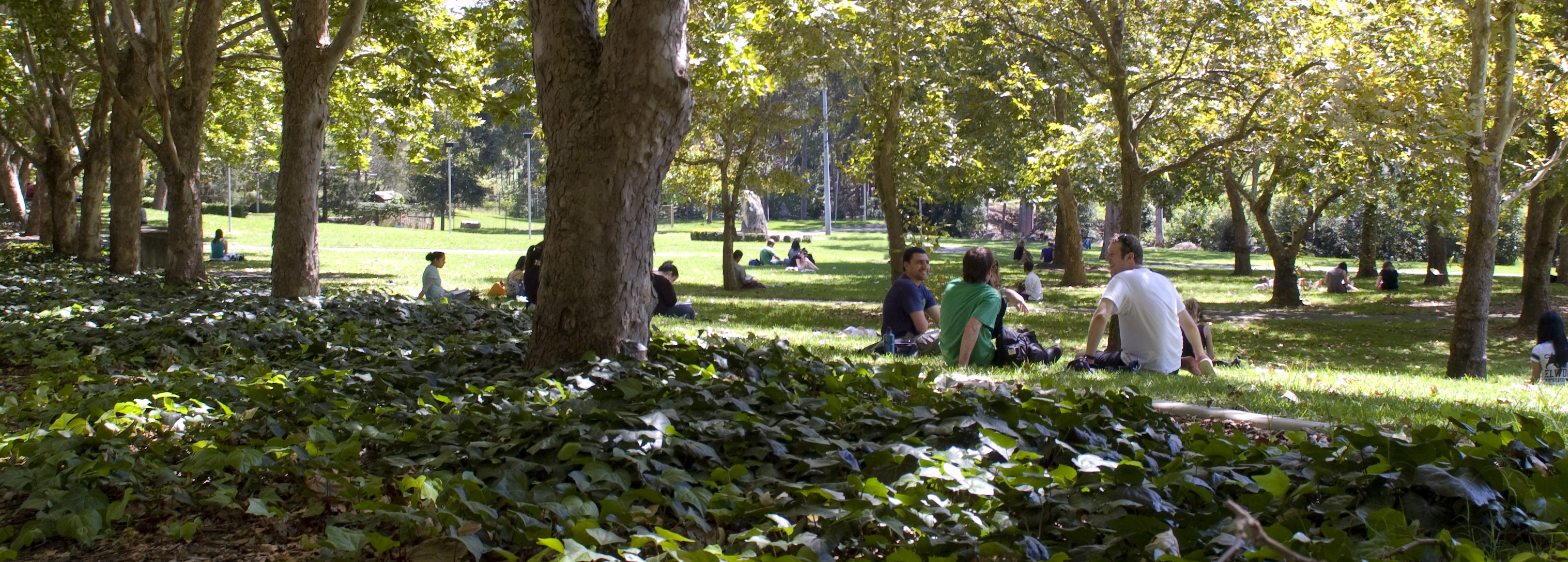
Students relaxing near Wally's Walk Park

Campus Life manages the university's non-academic services: food and retail, sport and recreation, student groups, child care, and entertainment. From late 2017 onward its Campus Hub facility has been closed for reconstruction; a 'pop-up'-style replacement, the Campus Common, has been opened for the duration.

=== Student demographics ===
Macquarie is the fourth largest university in Sydney (38,753 students in 2013). The university has the largest student exchange program in Australia.

In 2012, 9,802 students from Asia were enrolled at Macquarie University (Sydney campuses and offshore programs in China, Hong Kong, Korea and Singapore).

=== Student media and radio ===
Macquarie University has its own community radio station on campus, 2SER FM. The station is jointly owned by Macquarie University and the University of Technology Sydney.

=== Campus traditions ===
Macquarie University students celebrate Conception Day each year since 1969 to – according to legend – commemorate the date of conception of Lachlan Macquarie, as his birthday fell at the wrong time of year for a celebration. Conception Day is traditionally held on the last day of classes before the September mid-semester break.

=== Sports and athletics ===
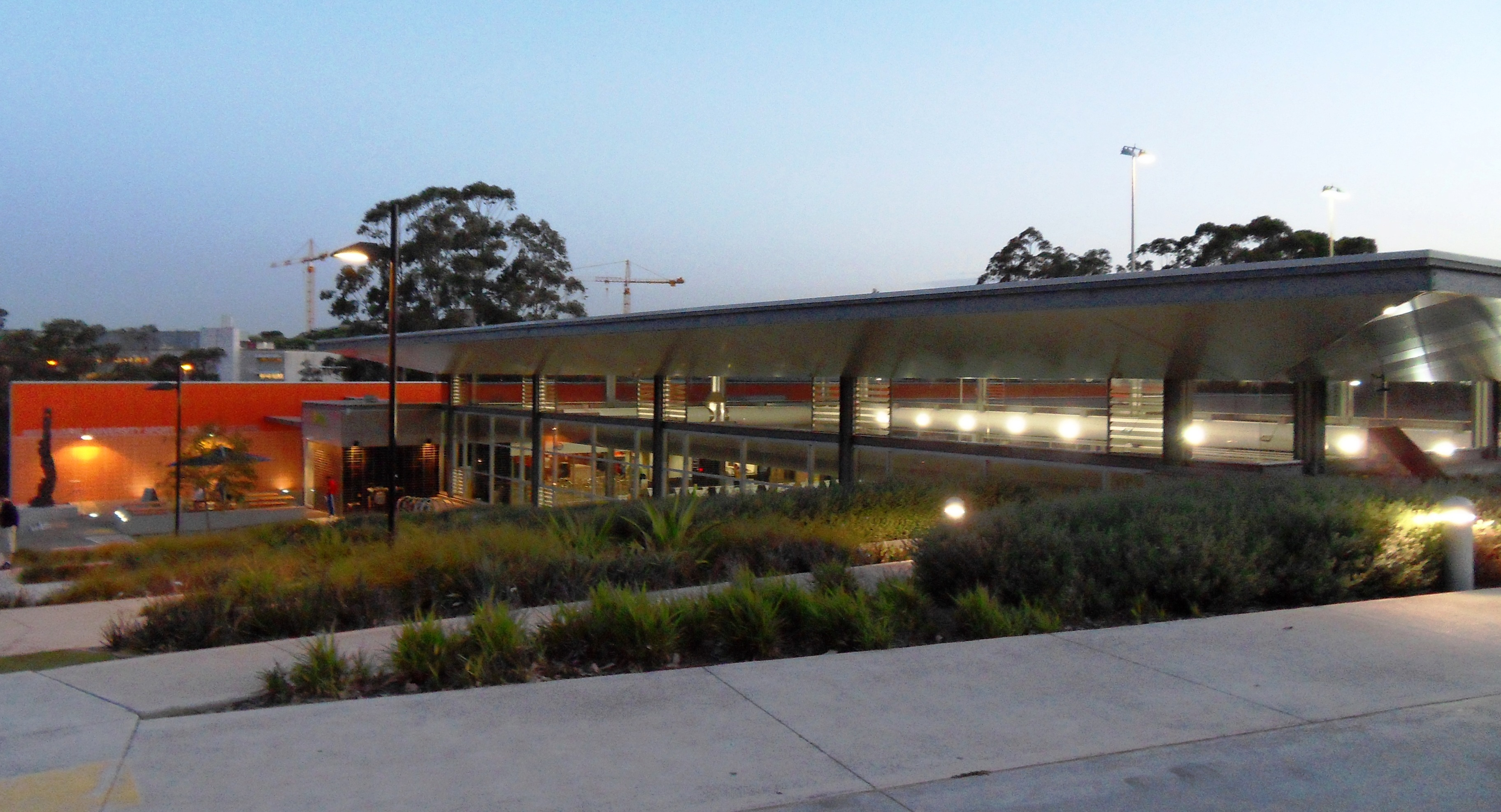
Sport and Aquatic Centre

On the western side of the campus is the Macquarie University Sport and Aquatic Centre. Previously a sports hall facility, the complex was renovated and reopened in 2007 with the addition of the new gym and aquatic centre. It houses a 50-metre FINA-compliant outdoor pool and a 25-metre indoor pool. The complex also contains a gymnasium and squash, badminton, basketball, volleyball and netball courts.

Macquarie also has seven hectares of high-quality playing fields for football, cricket and tennis. Just north of the campus, the fields are used by the university as well as a number of elite sporting teams, such as Sydney FC and the Matildas.

=== Residential colleges ===
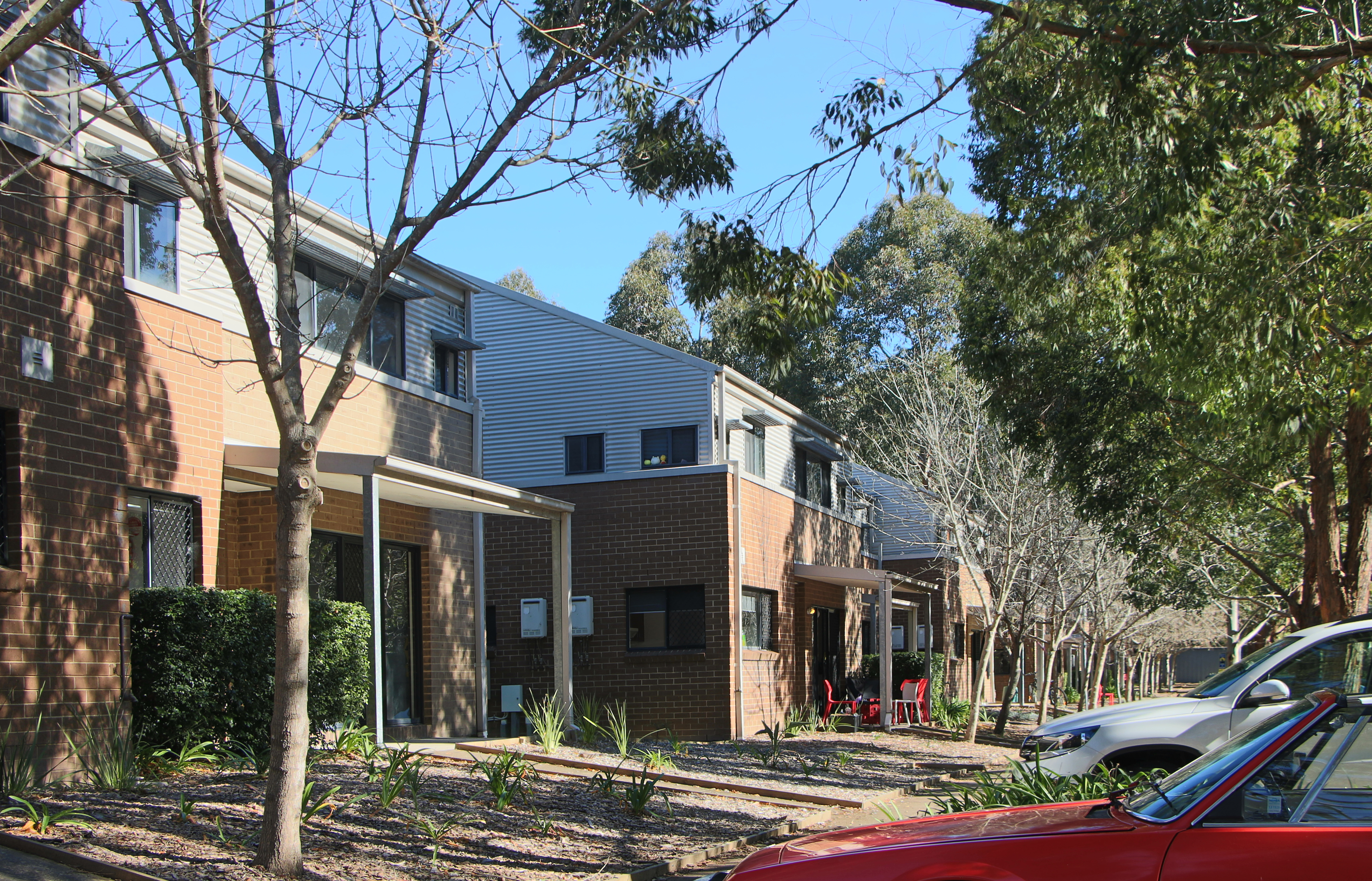
Student Village North Ryde student accommodation

Macquarie University has two residential colleges on its campus, Dunmore Lang College and Robert Menzies College, both founded in 1972. The colleges both offer academic support as well as a range of social and sporting activities in a communal environment.

Separate to the colleges is Student Village North Ryde in Marsfield, New South Wales. The village was developed by the university in 2001 for the purpose of housing students adjacent to the university campus and also housed Olympians for the Sydney 2000 Olympics. As of 2006, the village is now operated by Campus Living Villages, a company operating University Villages across Australia. It has over 900 rooms in mostly townhouse-style buildings north of the campus. The village encourages its students to interact in its communal spaces and has a number of social events throughout the year.

=== Leadership and development ===
The Global Leadership Program (GLP) is a university-funded co-curricular program that is open to all students and can be undertaken alongside any degree at Macquarie University. The GLP aims to instil leadership and innovation skills, cross-cultural understanding and a sense of global citizenship in its graduates. Upon successful completion of the GLP, students receive a formal notation on their academic transcript and a certificate.

Macquarie's GLP was the first of its kind when it launched in the Australian university sector in 2005 and is the country's flagship tertiary global leadership program with more than 4000 active participants in more than 200 academic disciplines. GLP is a co-curricular learning and engagement program that students design according to their own interests and complete at their own pace. Students are required to complete a workshop series, attend tailored keynote speaker and networking events and complete an experiential credit component. This ranges from short-term study abroad, volunteering (domestic and/or international), internships (domestic and/or international), learning a new language or attending internationally themed seminars and study tours.

The GLP won the Institute for International Education's 2017 Heiskell award for Innovation in International Education - Internationalising the Campus. Macquarie University is the first Southern Hemisphere university to receive the award in its 17-year history. The GLP was awarded the 2018 NSW International Student Community Engagement Award (Joint Winner) in the Education Provider category. This award recognises the innovative way in which the GLP facilitates connection and engagement with community for Macquarie University International GLP Students, and also recognises the contribution that the GLP makes to the International Student experience in New South Wales. In 2019, the GLP won the Global PIEoneer Award for International Education in the category of 'Progressive Education Delivery' in Guildhall, London. The PIEoneer Awards are the only global awards that celebrate innovation and achievement across the whole of the international education industry.

=== Transportation ===
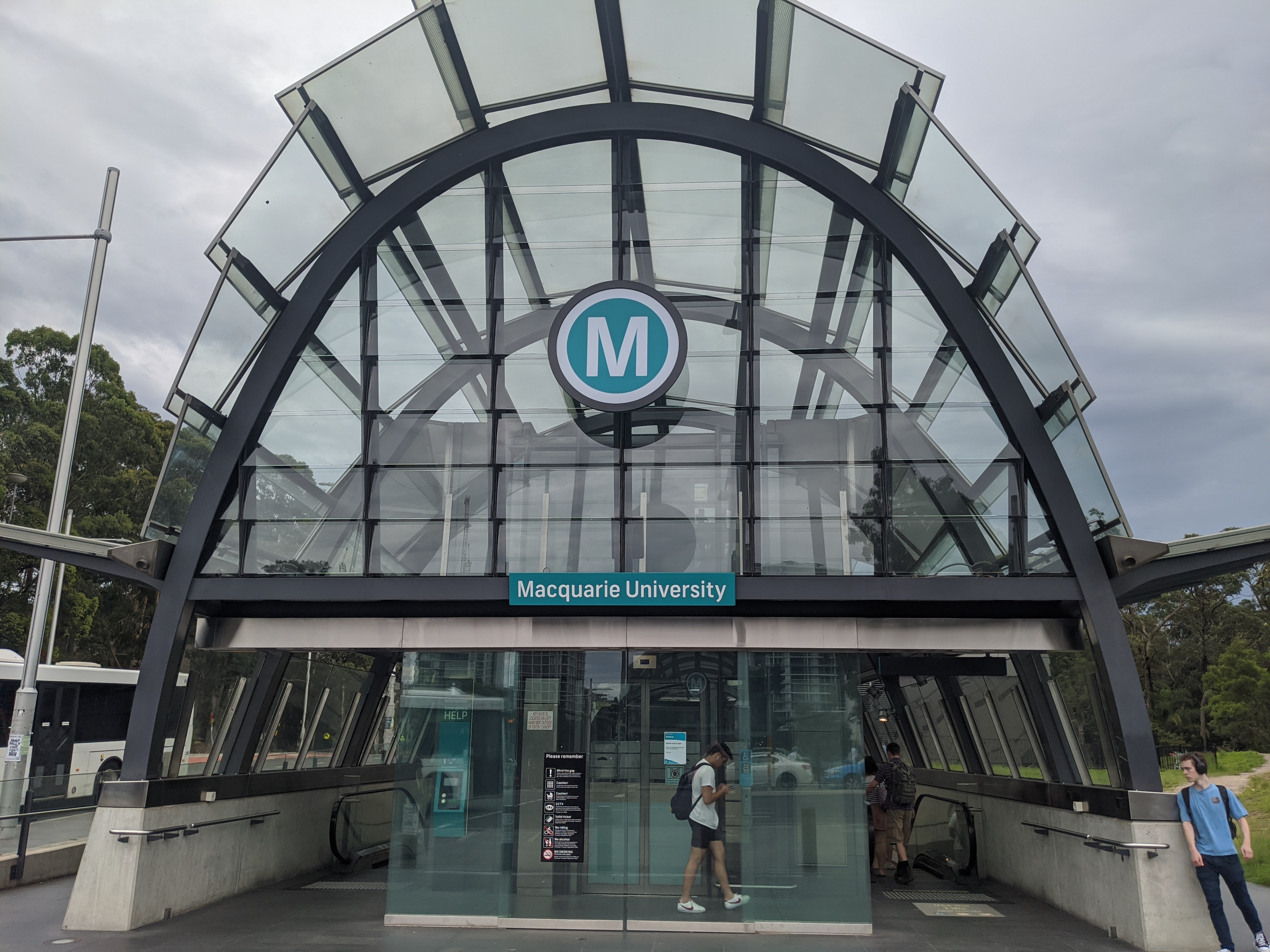
Macquarie University station

Macquarie University is served by Macquarie University railway station on the Metro North West & Bankstown Line. Macquarie is Australia's only university with a railway station on campus.

There is also a major bus interchange on the campus that provides close to 800 bus services daily. The M2 Motorway runs parallel to the campus's northern boundary and is accessible to traffic from the university.

== Notable people ==
=== Notable alumni ===
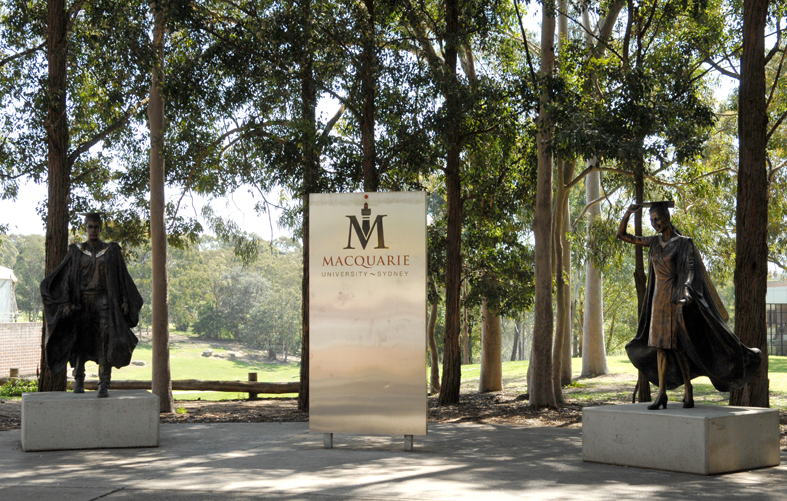
Life-size bronze statue of Graduates outside Macquarie University by sculptor Linda Klarfeld

Alumni include Rhodes and John Monash Scholars and several Fulbright Scholars.

Notable alumni include: Minister for the Environment and Water, Tanya Plibersek; Australian politician and former Lord Mayor of Brisbane, Jim Soorley; New South Wales Minister for Health, Brad Hazzard; 16th prime minister of Sri Lanka, Harini Amarasuriya; Australian politician, Mike Kelly; Australian basketball player, Lauren Jackson; Australian swimmer, Ian Thorpe; Australian water polo player, Holly Lincoln-Smith; three founding members of the Australian children's musical group The Wiggles, Murray Cook, Anthony Field, and Greg Page; former director-general of the National Library of Australia, Anne-Marie Schwirtlich AM; New Zealand conservationist, Pete Bethune; Miss Universe Australia 2008, Laura Dundovic; Australian journalist, Hugh Riminton and BBC Presenter, Yalda Hakim.

Notable alumni in science include: Australian scientist Barry Brook, American physicist Frank Duarte, and Australian physicist Cathy Foley. Alumni notable in the business world include: Australian hedge fund manager Greg Coffey, Australian businesswoman Catherine Livingstone, founder of Freelancer.com Matt Barrie, businessman Napoleon Perdis; Australian venture capitalist Larry R. Marshall; former CEO of Seven West Media, David Leckie; Australian economist, Sean Turnell; former CEO of Commonwealth Bank and former chairman of the Australian Government Future Fund Board of Guardians, David Murray.

=== Academics and staff ===
Notable faculty members include: Indian neurosurgeon, B. K. Misra; Australian writer and four time Miles Franklin Award winner, Thea Astley; Hungarian Australian mathematician, Esther Szekeres; Australian mathematician, Neil Trudinger; Australian environmentalist and activist, Tim Flannery; British physicist and author, Paul Davies; British-Australian physicist, John Clive Ward; Israeli-Australian mathematician, José Enrique Moyal; Australian linguist, Geoffrey Hull; Australian geologist, Fellow of the Australian Academy of Science, John Veevers; Australian climatologist, Ann Henderson-Sellers; Australian breakdancer and Olympian, Rachael Gunn; Australian sociologist, Raewyn Connell; Australian documentary filmmaker Tom Murray.

Four Macquarie University academics were included in The World's Most Influential Minds 2014 report by Thomson Reuters, which identified the most highly cited researchers of the last 11 years.

== Gallery ==
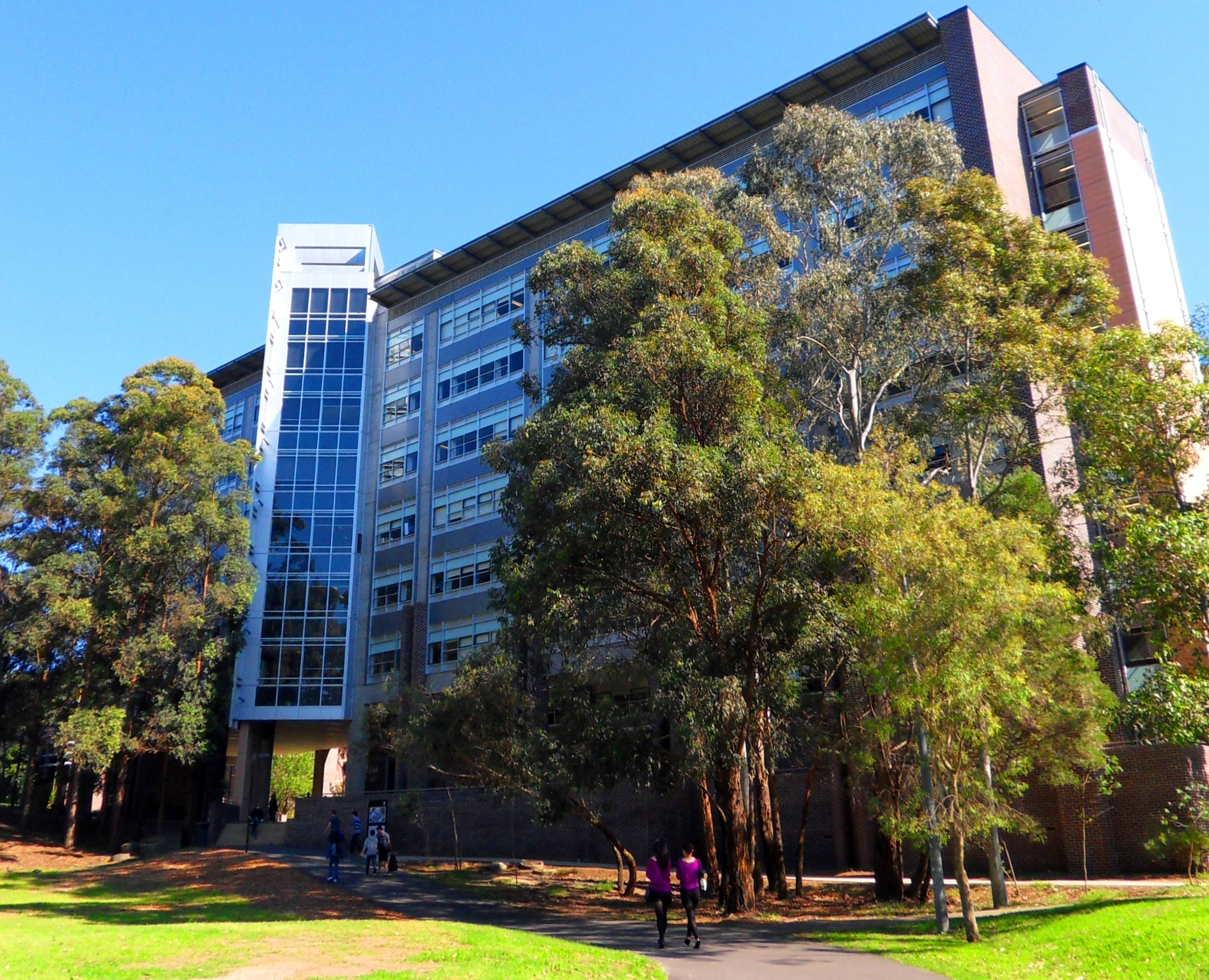
E4A Building at Entrance to University

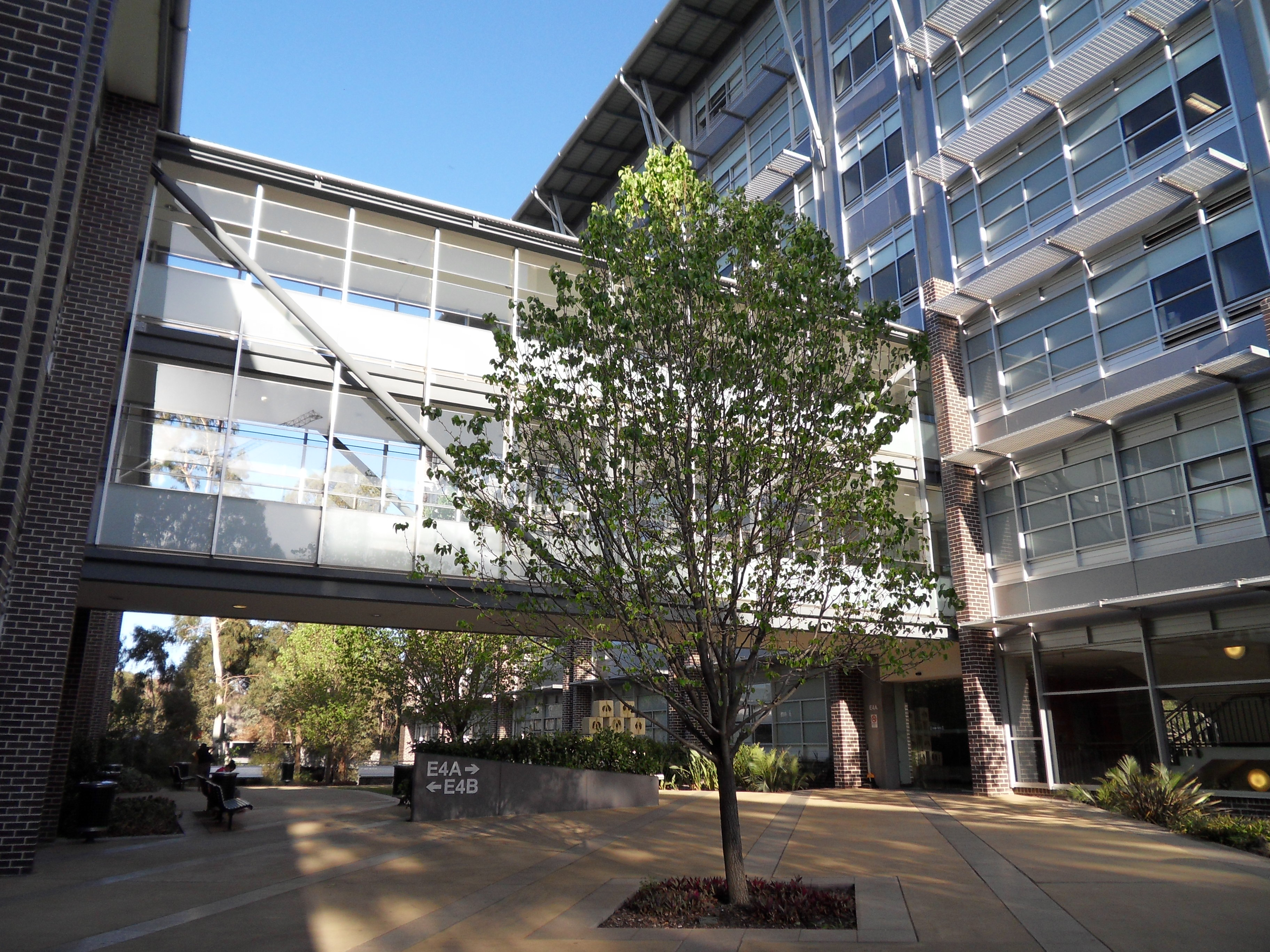
E4A courtyard

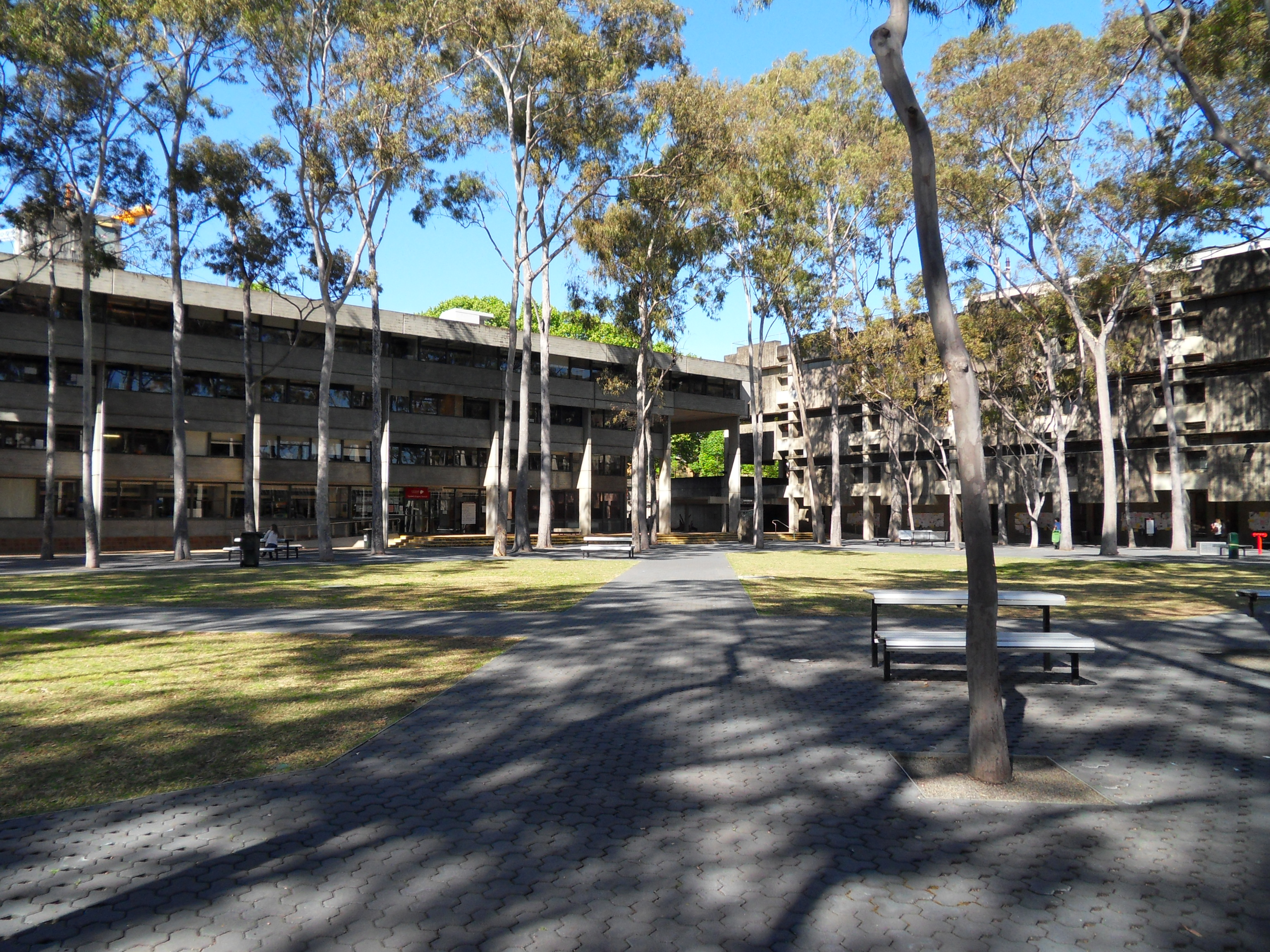
Central Courtyard

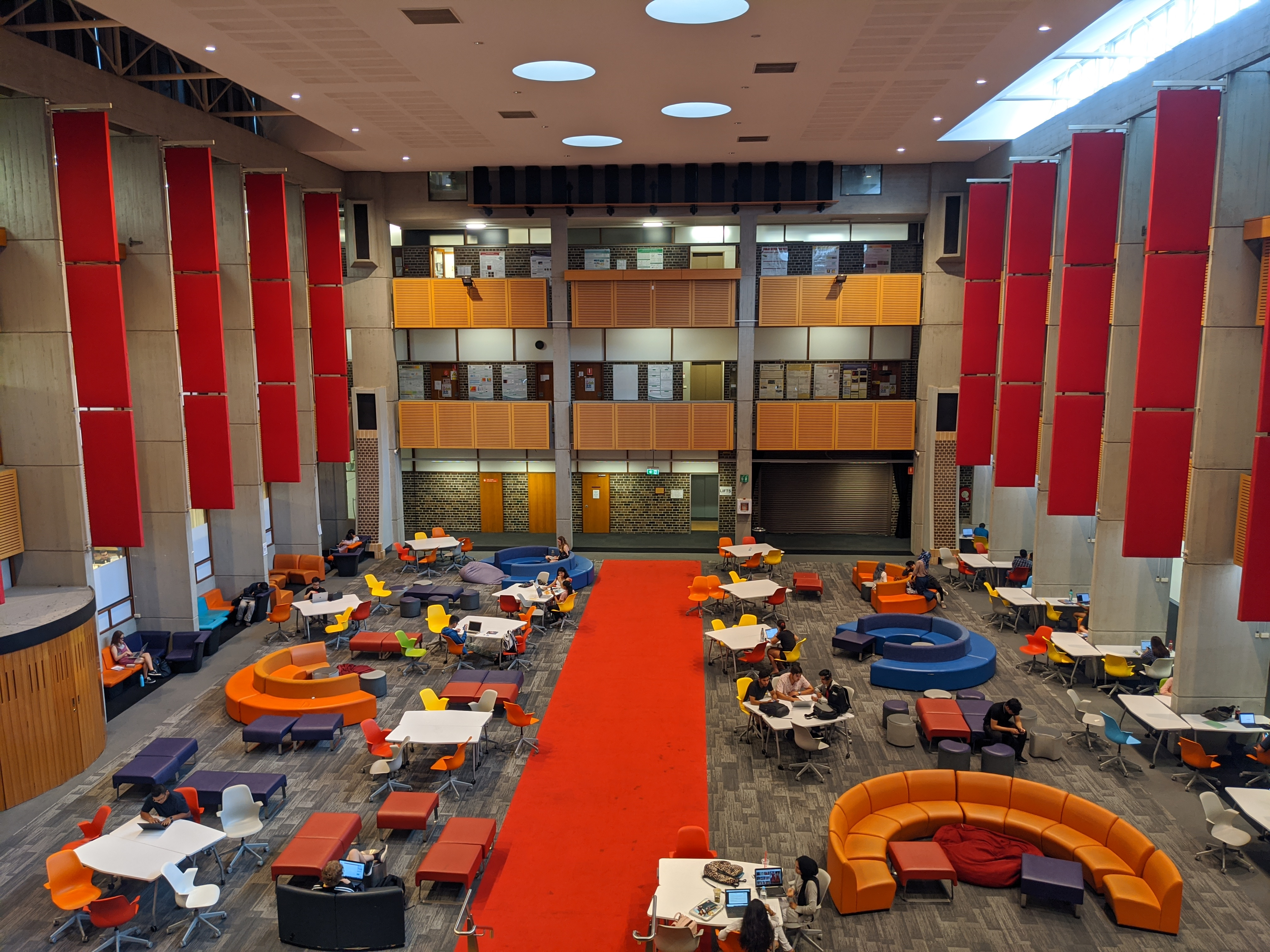
The Frederick Chong Courtyard

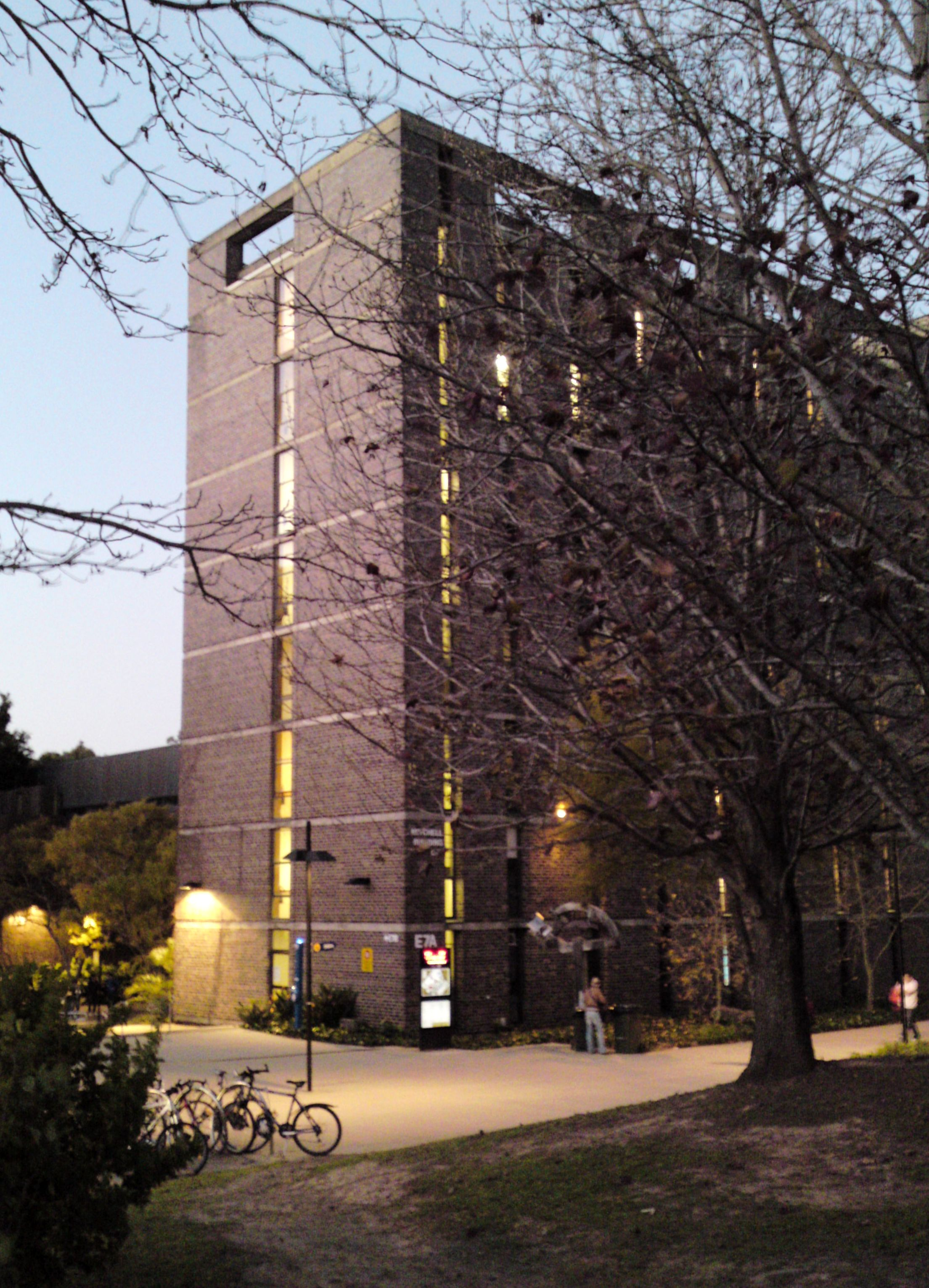
E7A Mitchell building

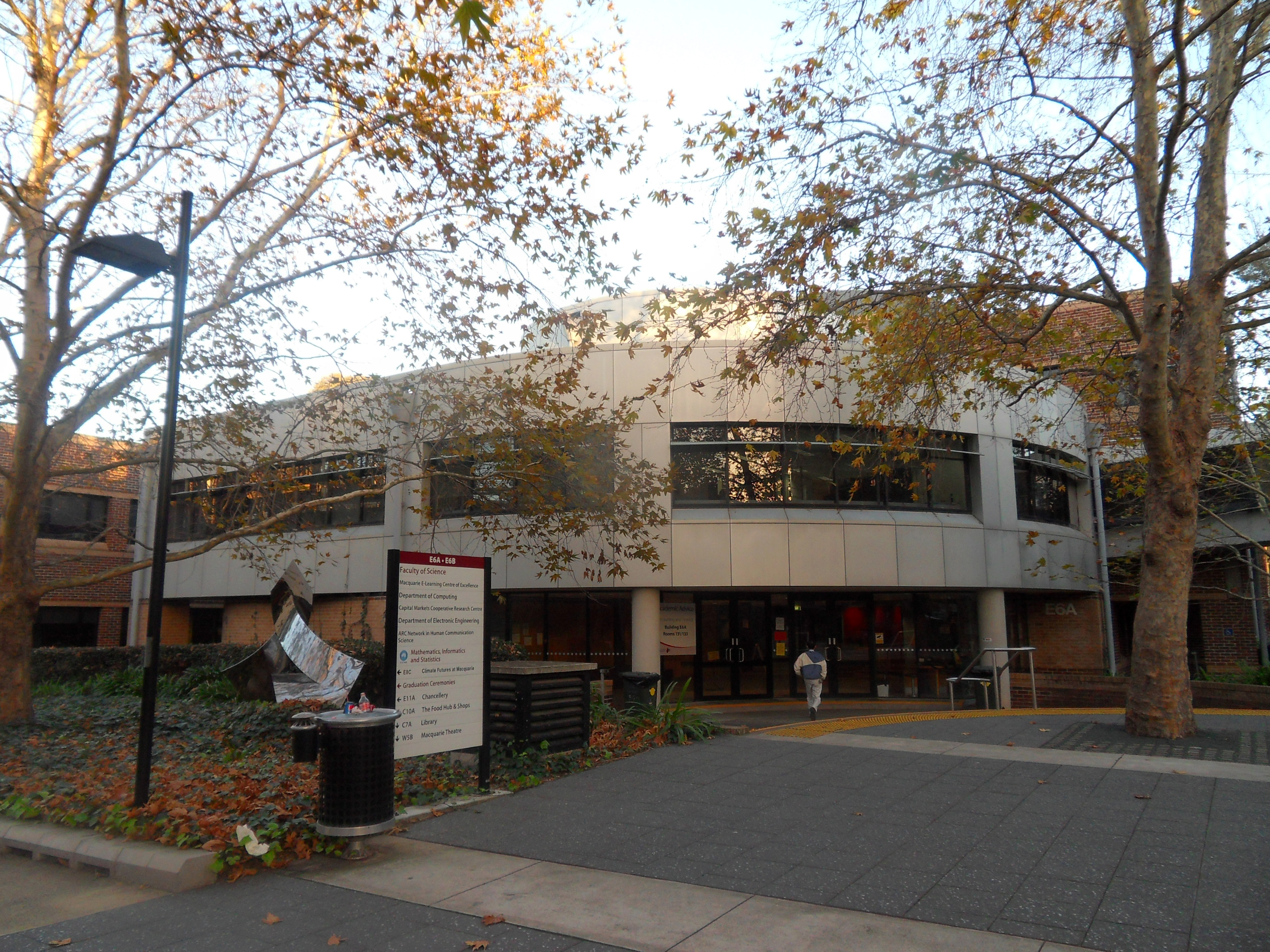
E6B building

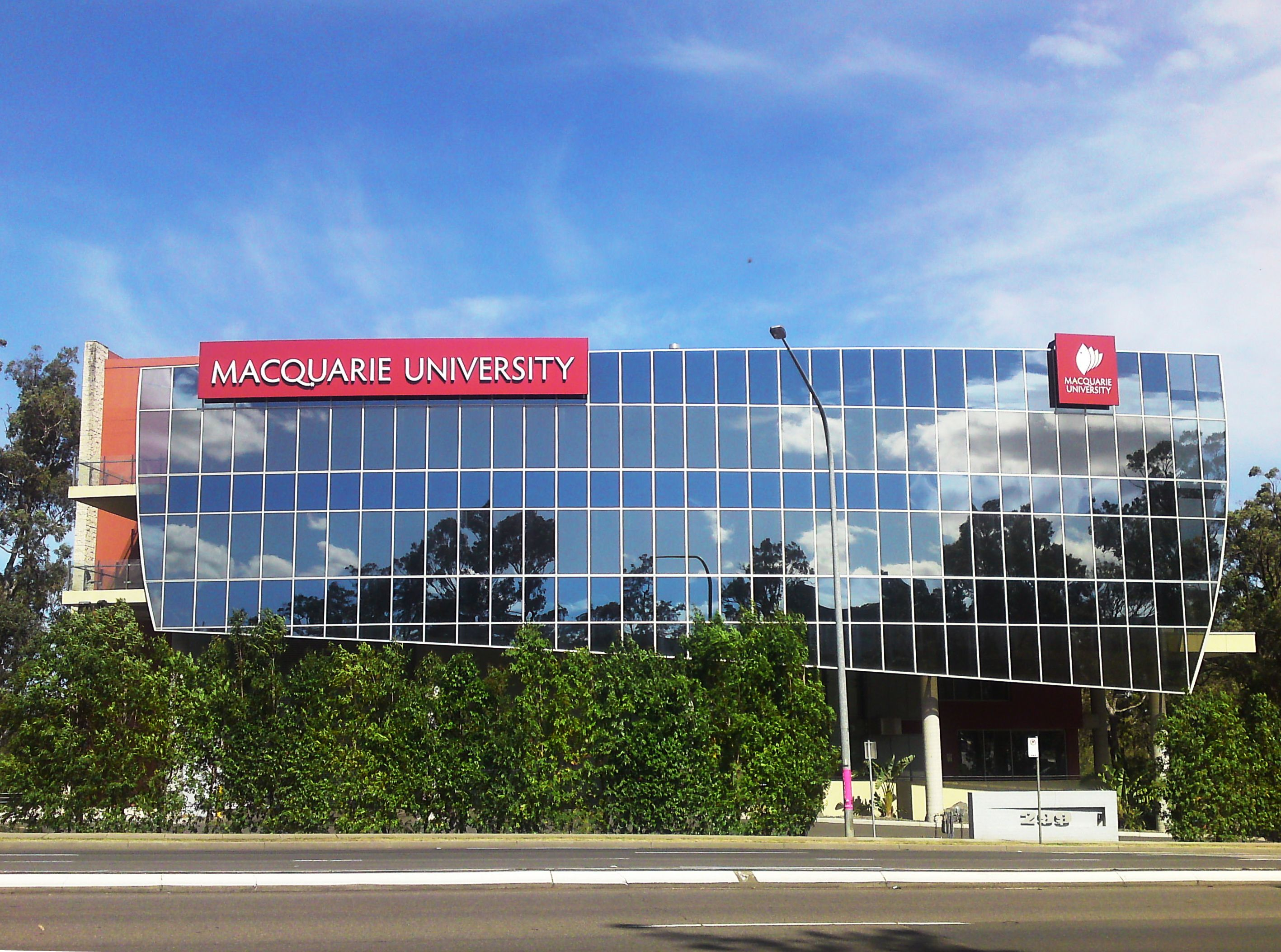
Lane Cove Rd building

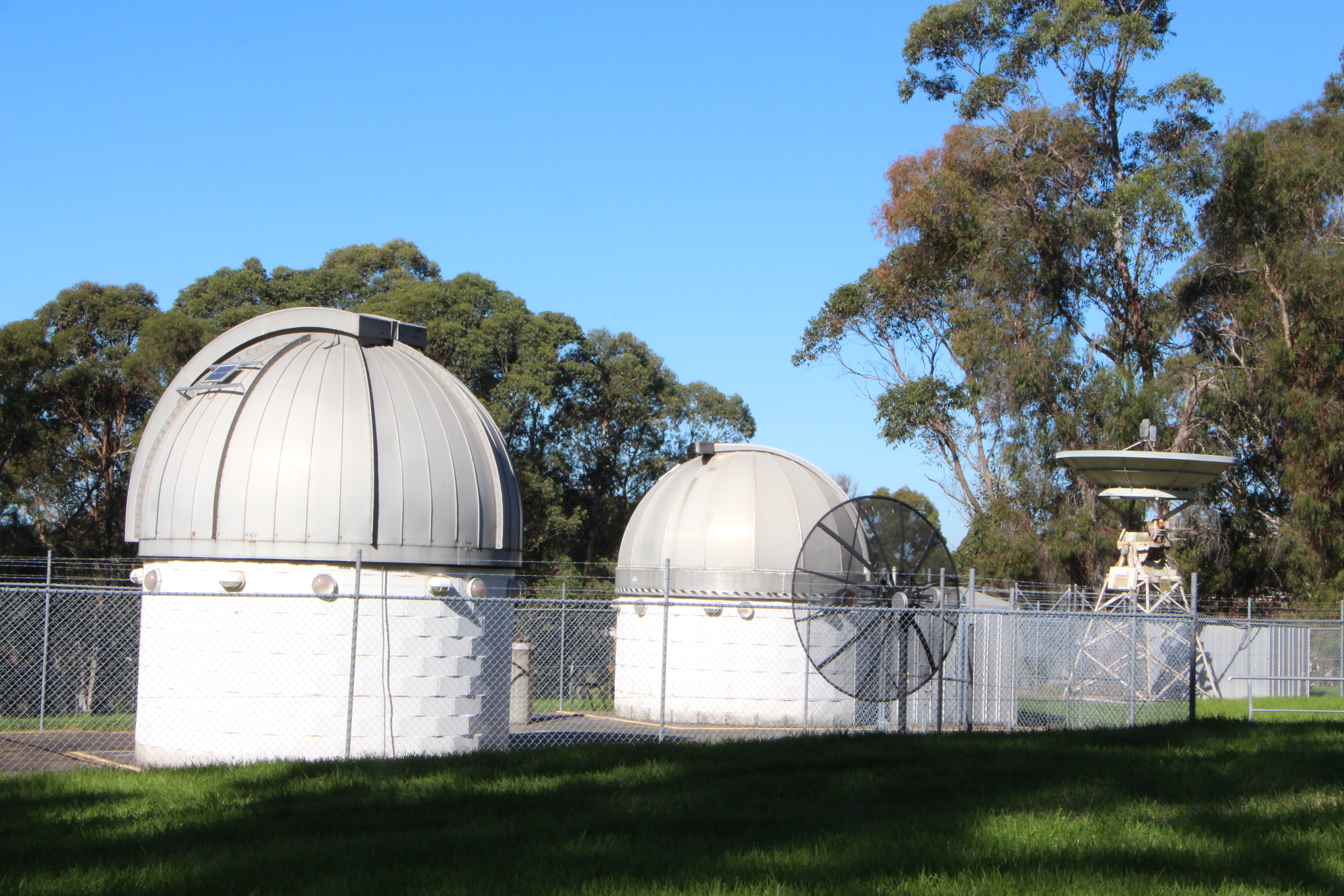
Macquarie University Observatory

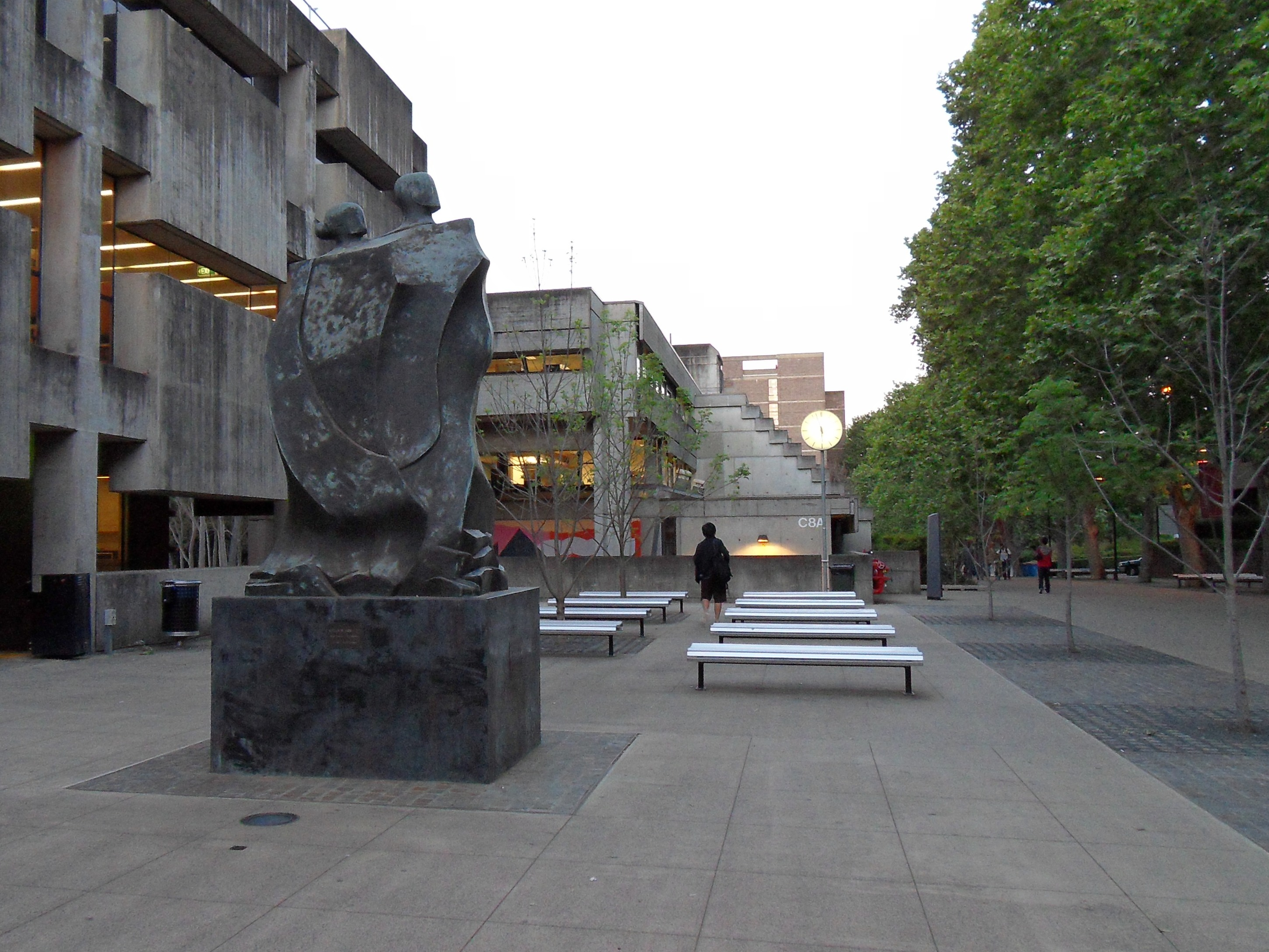
Building C7A

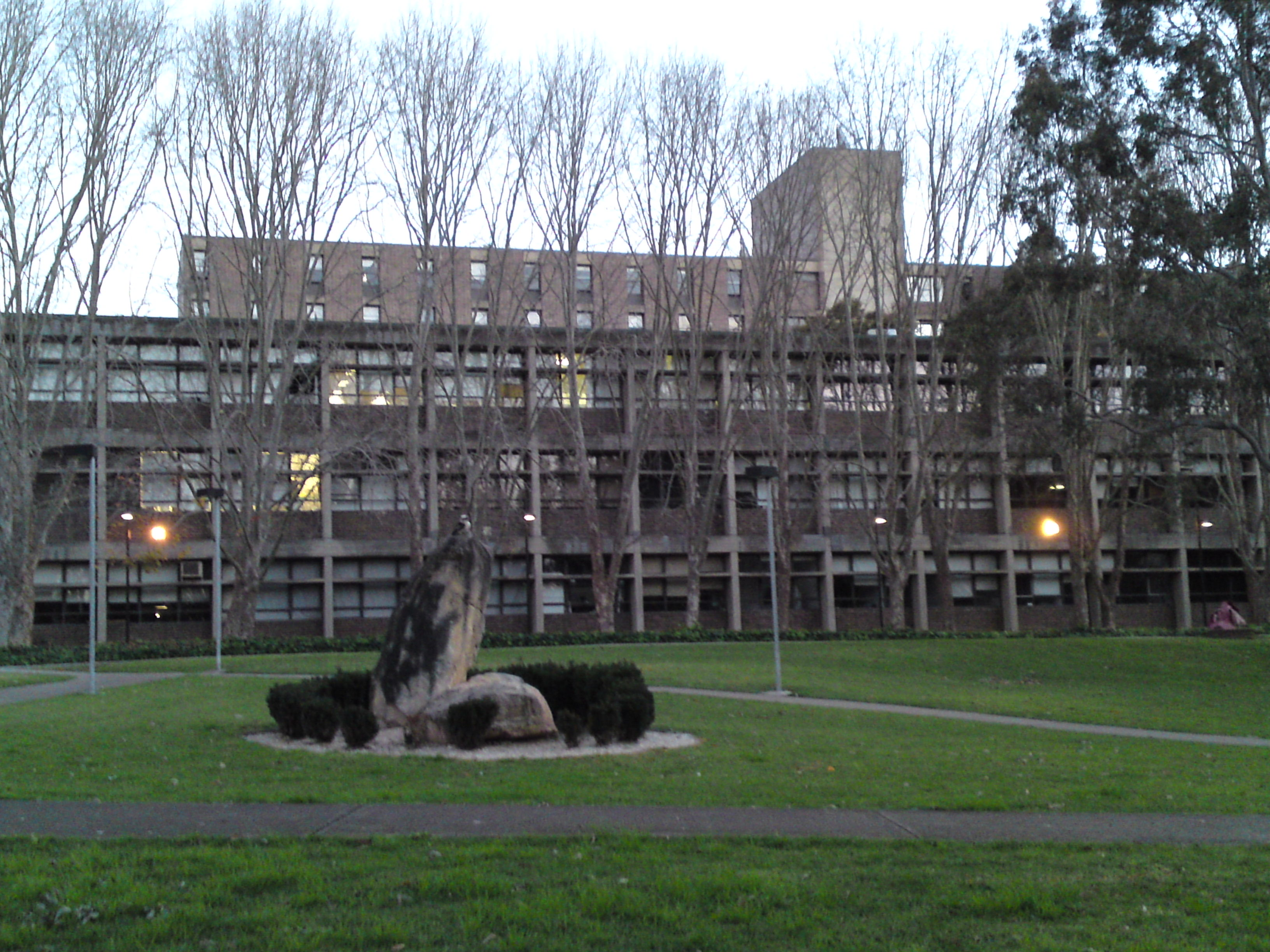
Former Faculty of Arts building

== See also ==
- List of Macquarie University people
- List of universities in Australia
- Macquarie University Sport and Aquatic Centre
- S*, a collaboration between seven universities and the Karolinska Institutet for training in bioinformatics and genomics
