= S. Bruce Dowton =

Australian-born paediatrician, researcher and academic (born 1956)

Stephen Bruce Dowton FACMG FRACP
- Born: 1956 (age 69–70); Ivanhoe, New South Wales, Australia
- Citizenship: Australian, United States
- Education: University of Sydney
- Occupation: Vice-Chancellor
- Years active: 2012 – present
- Organization: Macquarie University
- Title: Professor
- Predecessor: Steven Schwartz
- Website: vc.mq.edu.au

Stephen Bruce Dowton (born 1956) is the fifth Vice-Chancellor and President of Macquarie University in Sydney, Australia. He is a paediatrician, researcher, and academic, and has served as a senior medical executive at universities, healthcare institutions, and consulting organisations.

== Early life ==
Dowton was born in Ivanhoe in the far Far West region of New South Wales and raised in Dubbo. He moved to Sydney in 1975 to commence tertiary studies and was the first in his family to attend university.

=== Education ===
He graduated from the University of Sydney Bachelor of Medicine and Bachelor of Surgery (with Honours) in 1980. He also holds a doctorate of medicine (MD) for his work in cell biology from the University of Sydney, and completed postdoctoral training at Harvard Medical School and the Children’s Hospital Medical Centre, Boston. As a laboratory scientist, his work focused on regulation of the expression of genes for an important class of blood proteins.

== Career ==
He has published over 80 articles on a wide range of topics in peer-reviewed academic publications, and has held Visiting Professorial and External Examiner appointments at several universities including the University of Edinburgh, Columbia University, the University of Tromsø in Norway, Hong Kong University, as well as institutions in the People’s Republic of China.

Dowton has also held a variety of leadership roles at Harvard Medical International and subsequently Partners Harvard Medical International, most recently as its vice president and Chief Operating Officer. In these roles, he traveled to developing nations to guide the development of their medical education, strategy, and governance.

In 2001, the NSW Minister for Health, Craig Knowles, invited Dowton to establish a new ministerial council to oversee the reorganisation of graduate medical education across the state health system, the Medical Education and Training Council. Dowton also served as chair of the Committee of Deans of Australia in Medical Schools (CDAMS) from 2002 to 2004. During this time, the organisation consolidated and strengthened the funding base for the Rural Clinical Schools Initiative. As part of a multi-pronged initiative as chair of CDAMS, with other decanal colleagues, he oversaw the establishment and implementation of the Indigenous Health Project through a partnership with the Office of Aboriginal and Torres Strait Islander Health in the Commonwealth Department of Health and Ageing implementation of the Indigenous Health Project. With this platform, a nationwide indigenous Health Curriculum Framework was developed and ratified.

=== Macquarie University ===
Macquarie University announced the appointment of Dowton as their fifth Vice-Chancellor in July 2012, and he assumed the role in September that year, leaving his post as clinical professor of paediatrics at the Harvard Medical School.

In June 2019, questions were raised about payments Dowton received for hosting university functions at his home. The hosting payments received by Dowton totaled $222,000 over four years (2014 to 2018). The house was bought with a loan drawn from the university, and interest payments in the same period totaled $129,000.

== Philanthropy ==
Alongside his role as Vice-Chancellor, Dowton holds the following positions:

- Member of the Board of Trustees of the Art Gallery of NSW, appointed for a two-year term commencing 1 January 2015.
- Chairman of the Board of Open Universities Australia.

He was a member of the Board of the Maggie Beer Foundation from 2014 until 2016.
