= Macquarie University Campus Experience =

- Type: Public company
- Industry: Student Services and Amenities
- Founded: 2008 as U@MQ
- Headquarters: Sydney, Australia
- Area served: Macquarie University
- Parent: Macquarie University
- Website: http://www.campuslife.mq.edu.au

Campus Experience is the student organisation at Macquarie University and is a wholly owned subsidiary company of the University. The organisation manages Macquarie University's non-academic services of food and retail, entertainment, sport and recreation, student groups, child care and student publications. The organisation also houses an elected student representative council.

Campus Experience was officially launched in January 2008 under the name of U@MQ, and is the result of the merging of the three previous student organisations, which were the Union (which for several years operated under the name 'Students at Macquarie' or S@M), the Students' Council (generally known as MUSC) and the sport and recreation (known generally as MUSR).

== Macquarie University Students' Council (MUSC) ==
The Macquarie University Students' Council (MUSC) was the organised student body of Macquarie University, trading under Macquarie University Union Ltd (MUUL). It comprised many parts with the representative council elected by undergraduate students as its main body. Later students of the private Sydney Institute of Business and Technology (SIBT) were also included. During its history it was also representative of post-graduate students until the creation of Macquarie University Post-graduate Representative Association. As well as the council there were clubs, societies, collectives, departments and publications that made up the whole MUSC. These clubs, societies, departments and collectives all had various degrees of autonomy from the actual council.

The council itself was the governing body of the MUSC and was answerable to the student population. In its early days, its engagement reached out to a large percentage of students. The council had a number of activist collectives open to all students around its key areas of operation. The number of focus of the collectives changed over time. The council also provided consumer type services to its members, including legal aid and academic advocacy. MUSC was created to provide a voice to students at the main campus.

When under the control of the far left, MUSC built alliances with non-student organisations and movements. During 1973, the MUSC worked with the Builders Labourers Federation - BLF (a union whose members now make up part of the Construction, Forestry, Mining and Energy Union (CFMEU)) to organise one of the first 'Pink Bans'.

In 1979, an ALP-dominated MUSC successfully organised a student referendum which saw MUSC disaffiliate from the Australian Union of Students. This was part of a national campaign against the Australian Union of Students which involved a wide range of political groupings ranging from Liberal students to the Communist Party of Australia (Marxist-Leninist).

In its later years, MUSC established a Women's Department. The Women's Department was an autonomous Department of the MUSC. A women's collective operated through the department and was open to all women students. It operated to effect change in the lives of women on campus and in their everyday lives. The Women's Department was elected separately to the MUSC Council by women students only.

== End of MUSC and Merger ==
During 2007, Macquarie University faced a restructuring of its student organisation after an audit raised questions about management of hundreds of thousands of dollars in funds by student organisations At the centre of the investigation was Victor Ma, president of the Macquarie University Students' Council (MUSC). Vice Chancellor Schwartz cited the need for the urgent need to reform Macquarie's main student bodies. The Federal Court ordered on 23 May 2007 that Macquarie University Union Ltd (MUUL), would be wound up.

Following the dissolution of Macquarie University Union Ltd, the outgoing student organisations were taken over by the University. In January 2008, the merged student organisation adopted the U@MQ brand.

The role of Student Representation was ultimately taken on by MUSRA (Macquarie University Student Representative Association) in 2009 with the first elections being held that year. By late 2009, the U@MQ brand was dropped in favour of the current name.

== Publications of MUSC ==
Arena was the newspaper of MUSC from 1968 to 1999. The editor was originally appointed by the council. However, from the mid-1970s, the editor (or editorial team) was directly elected by the student body. It was not unusual for the editorial team that was elected to be of a different political persuasion to the majority of council.

Hogben Toad was the weekly publication of MUSC that alerted students to the activities of the week and near future. This publication was later superseded by a publication of the Macquarie University Union.

Alternative Calendars were produced from 1976 to 1997, and once more in 2002. They were the result of surveys of students about the subjects they had taken.

Orientation Handbooks were also produced annually.

MUSCateer was the new publication name for Arena given to the paper by a council in the early 2000s. This council was aligned to the Student Unity faction at Macquarie University. Editorial control was taken by the same faction around the same time. After the change of name very few editions were produced. In 2005 MUSCateer ceased being published. There were allegations that this decision was made to "further the political ambitions of President, Victor Ma"

The current student publication is 'Grapeshot'.

== MUSC Collectives ==
The Education Collective was formed to allow all students to participate in the council around issues affecting tertiary education. The education collective not only took up issues affecting students at the Macquarie University campus, but also issues that affected access to tertiary education generally.

The Environment Collective focused on local and global issues about the environment. It often used direct action as a tool to bring about change. Locally this included many members of the collective climbing the trees in the middle of where the M2 Motorway was to be built.

The Sexuality Collective took up lesbian, gay, bisexual, transgender, intersex and queer issues. The collective was also instrumental in establishing a permanent Queer Space on campus is 2001.

The International Solidarity Collective engaged with issues of international importance. The collective focused it works on fighting imperialist actions, such as anti US bases campaigns through to the recognition of the democratic elections in Burma.

== See also ==
- Australian student politics
- National Union of Students of Australia
- Voluntary student unionism
