= Old universities =

Old universities may refer to:

- the seven ancient universities in Britain and Ireland established before 1600
- British universities that were universities before the formation of post-1992 universities

== See also ==
- Universities in the United Kingdom
