= Ancient university =

British and Irish universities founded before 1600

The ancient universities are a set of seven surviving British and Irish medieval universities and early modern universities that were founded before 1600 AD, and are located in Scotland, England, and Ireland. The seven universities are:

- England: University of Oxford and University of Cambridge
- Scotland: University of Edinburgh, University of Glasgow, University of St Andrews, and University of Aberdeen
- Ireland: University of Dublin

These ancient universities in Great Britain and Ireland are amongst the oldest extant universities in the world. The ancient universities in Britain are also among twenty-seven institutions recognised by the British monarchy as privileged bodies of the United Kingdom.

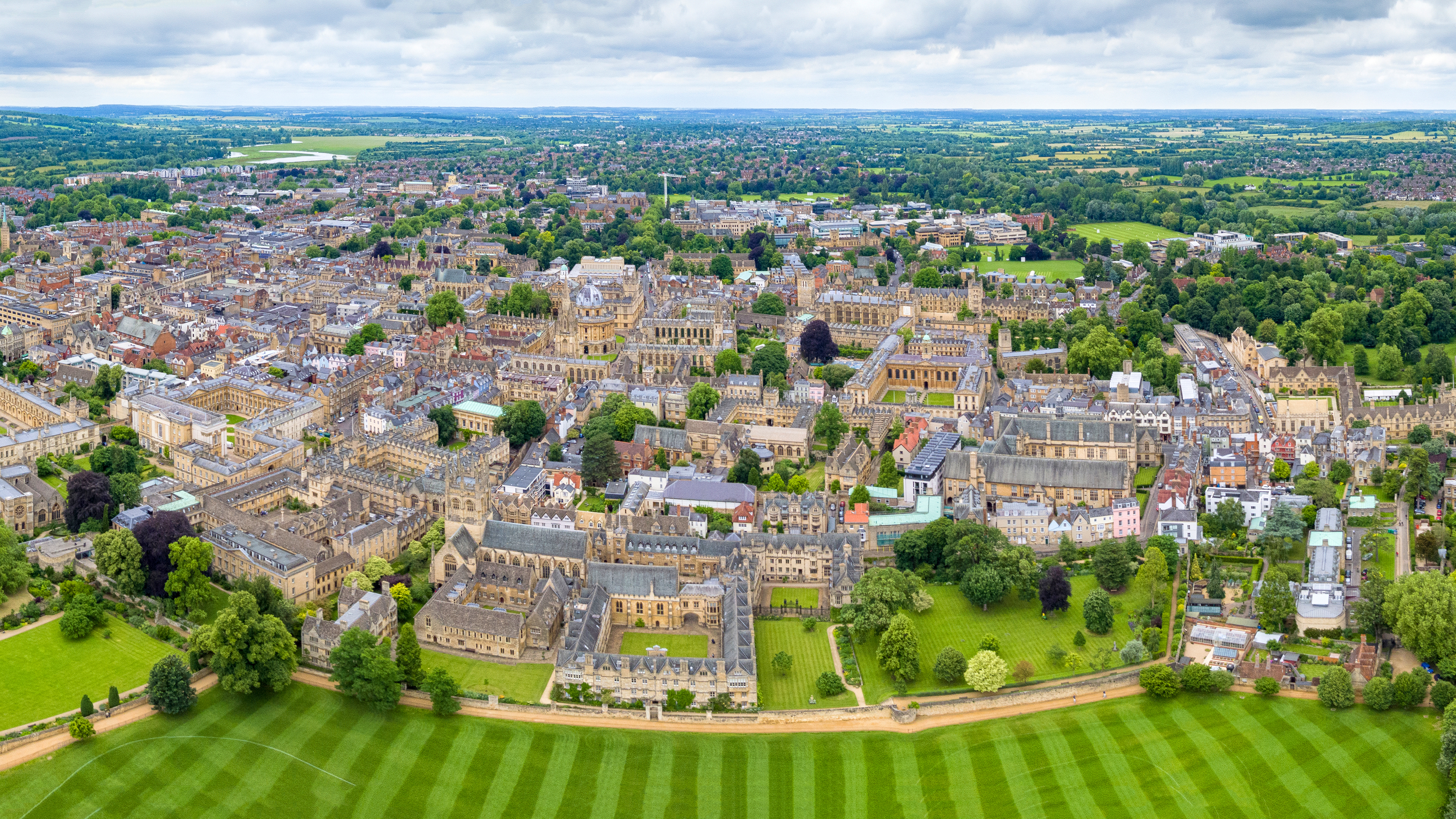
The University of Oxford in Oxford, England, is the oldest university in the English-speaking world

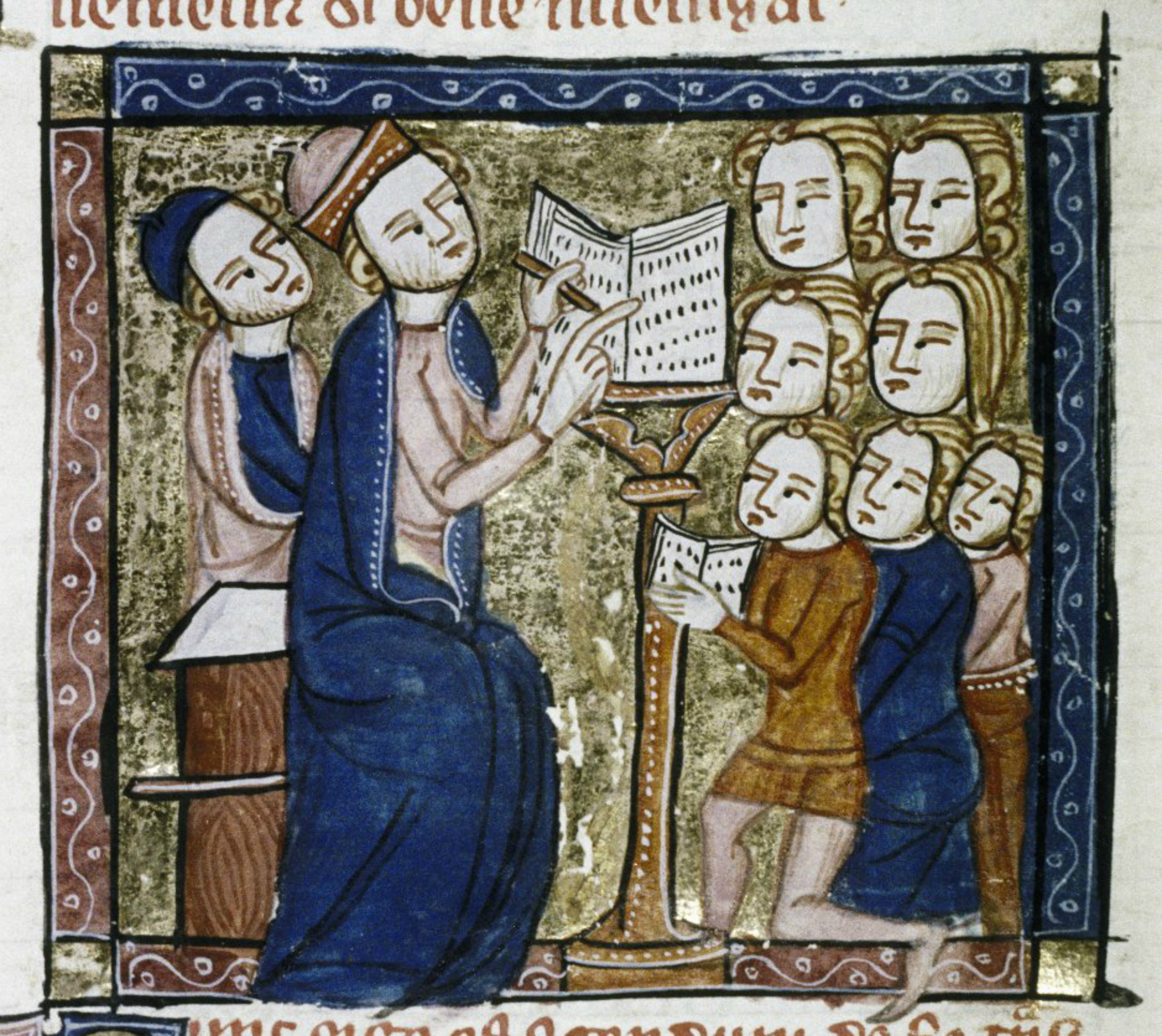
Illustration of William of Nottingham teaching at either Oxford or Cambridge, c. 1350.

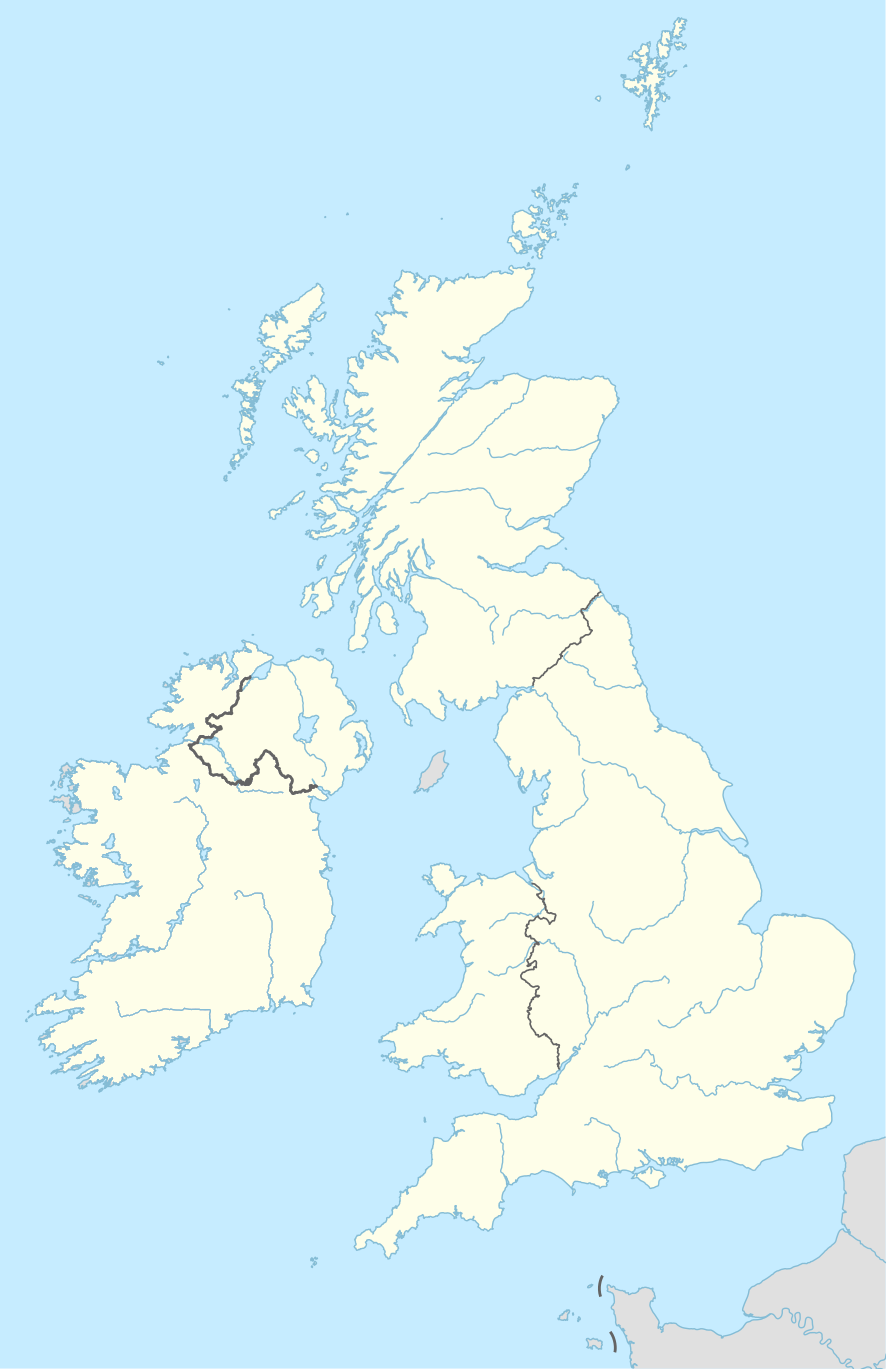
Locations of the ancient universities or colleges (red: extant; blue: defunct)

== Foundation and development ==
The surviving ancient universities in England, Scotland and Ireland are, in order of formation:

| Year | Name | Nation of Founding | Location | Notes |
|---|---|---|---|---|
| 1096 | University of Oxford | Kingdom of England | Oxford, England | Oxford's official website says, "There is no clear date of foundation, but teaching existed at Oxford in some form in 1096 and developed rapidly from 1167, when Henry II banned English students from attending the University of Paris." Teaching suspended in 1209 (due to town execution of two scholars) and 1355 (due to the St Scholastica Day riot). |
| 1209 | University of Cambridge | Kingdom of England | Cambridge, England | Founded by scholars leaving Oxford after a dispute caused by the execution of two scholars in 1209. It was generally recognized as a studium generale by the late 13th century and this was either confirmed or formally granted by a Papal bull in 1318. |
| 1413 | University of St Andrews | Kingdom of Scotland | St Andrews, Scotland | Founded by a papal bull building on earlier bodies established between 1410 and 1413, but officially recognized in 1413 |
| 1451 | University of Glasgow | Kingdom of Scotland | Glasgow, Scotland | Founded by a papal bull of Pope Nicholas V |
| 1495 | University of Aberdeen | Kingdom of Scotland | Aberdeen, Scotland | King's College, Aberdeen was founded in 1495 by papal bull and Marischal College in 1593; they merged in 1860 |
| 1582 | University of Edinburgh | Kingdom of Scotland | Edinburgh, Scotland | Established by the town council under the authority of a royal charter granted by James VI |
| 1592 | University of Dublin | Kingdom of Ireland | Dublin, Ireland | Founded by charter of Queen Elizabeth I; Trinity College is the only constituent college of the university |

In the Middle Ages, universities followed the canonical hours of the church. As the masters in the arts faculty would often also be students in one of the higher faculties, universities used these canonical hours to define periods when the compulsory lectures in the different facilities were given in order to prevent timetable clashes. At Cambridge, for example, only the canon lawyers could lecture between prime (dawn) and nones (mid afternoon). In the morning, there were lectures offered by regent masters on standard texts that they wanted to lecture. Then in the afternoon there would be advanced bachelors that would give lectures that reviews the material learned that morning. Also in the afternoon, the junior masters would discuss about other books of mathematical science or natural philosophy.

== Governance ==
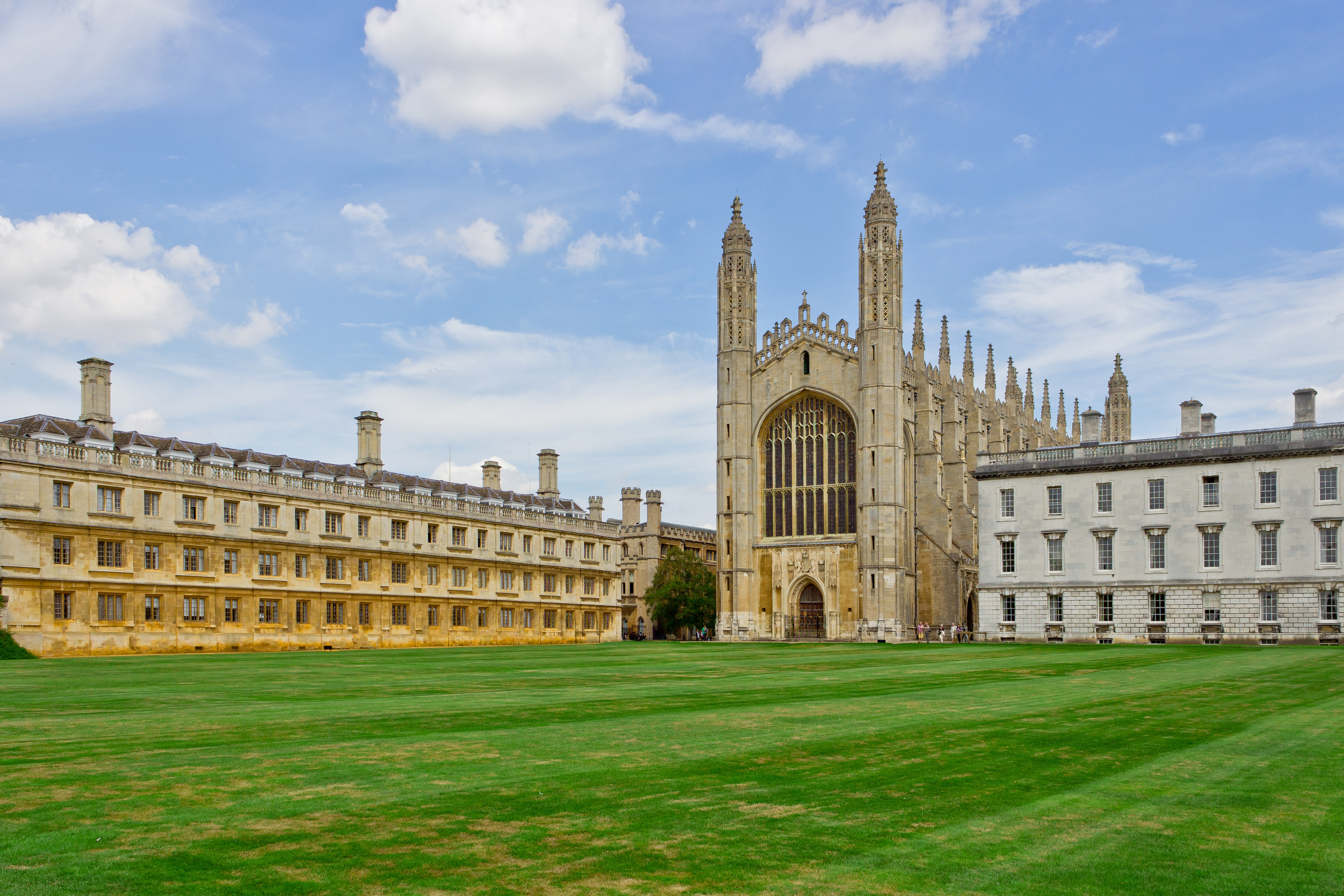
The University of Cambridge in Cambridge, England

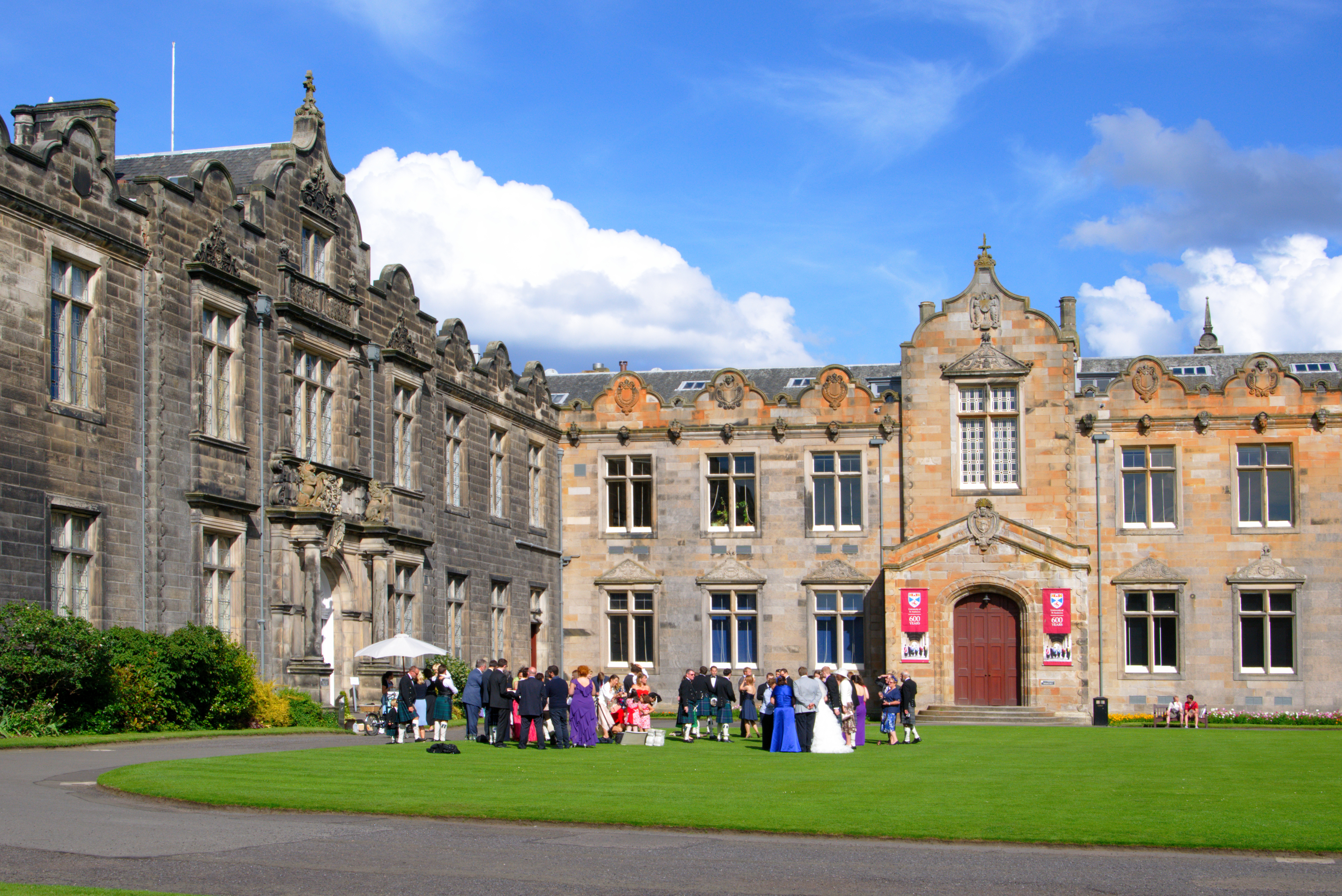
The University of St Andrews in St Andrews, Scotland

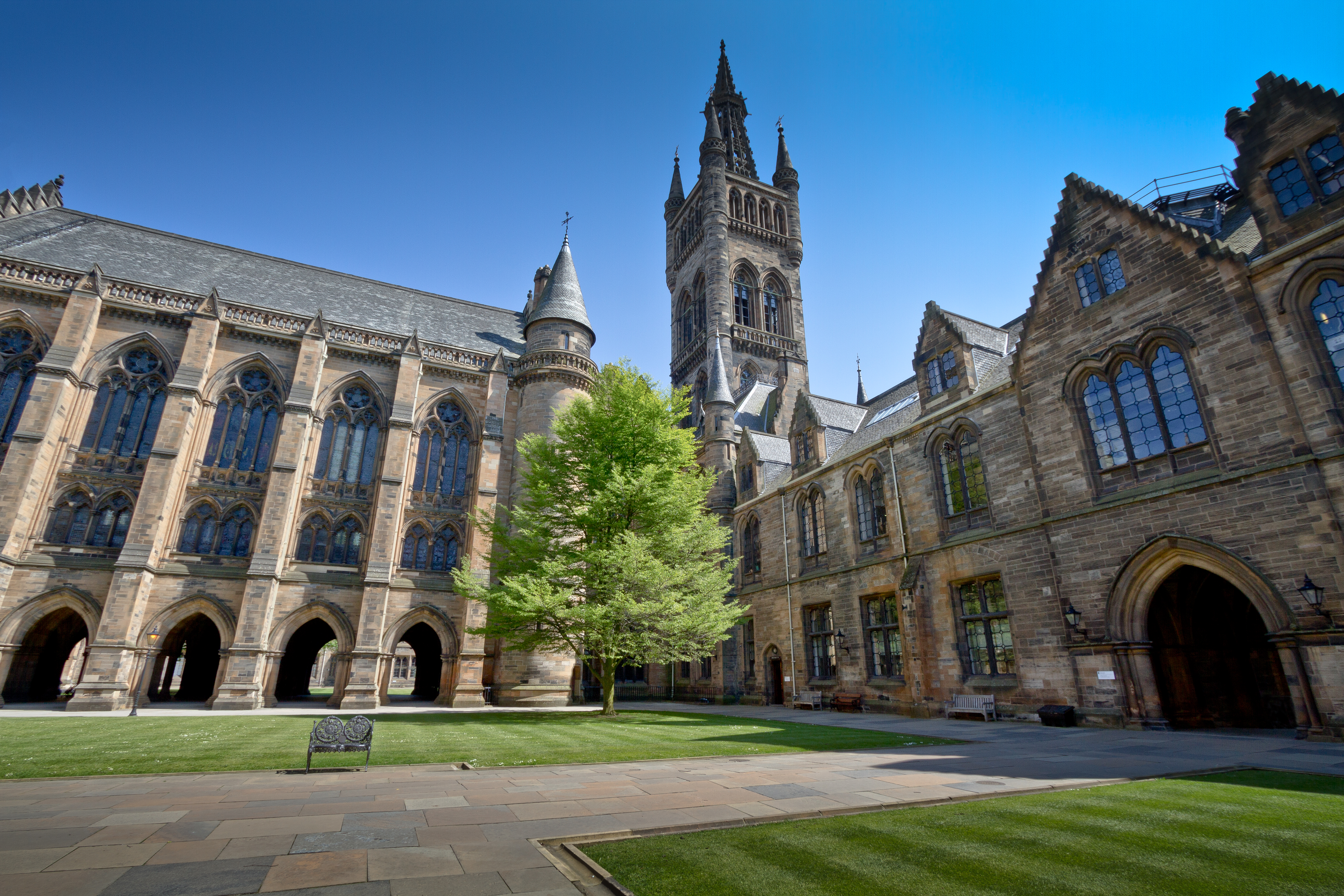
The University of Glasgow in Glasgow, Scotland

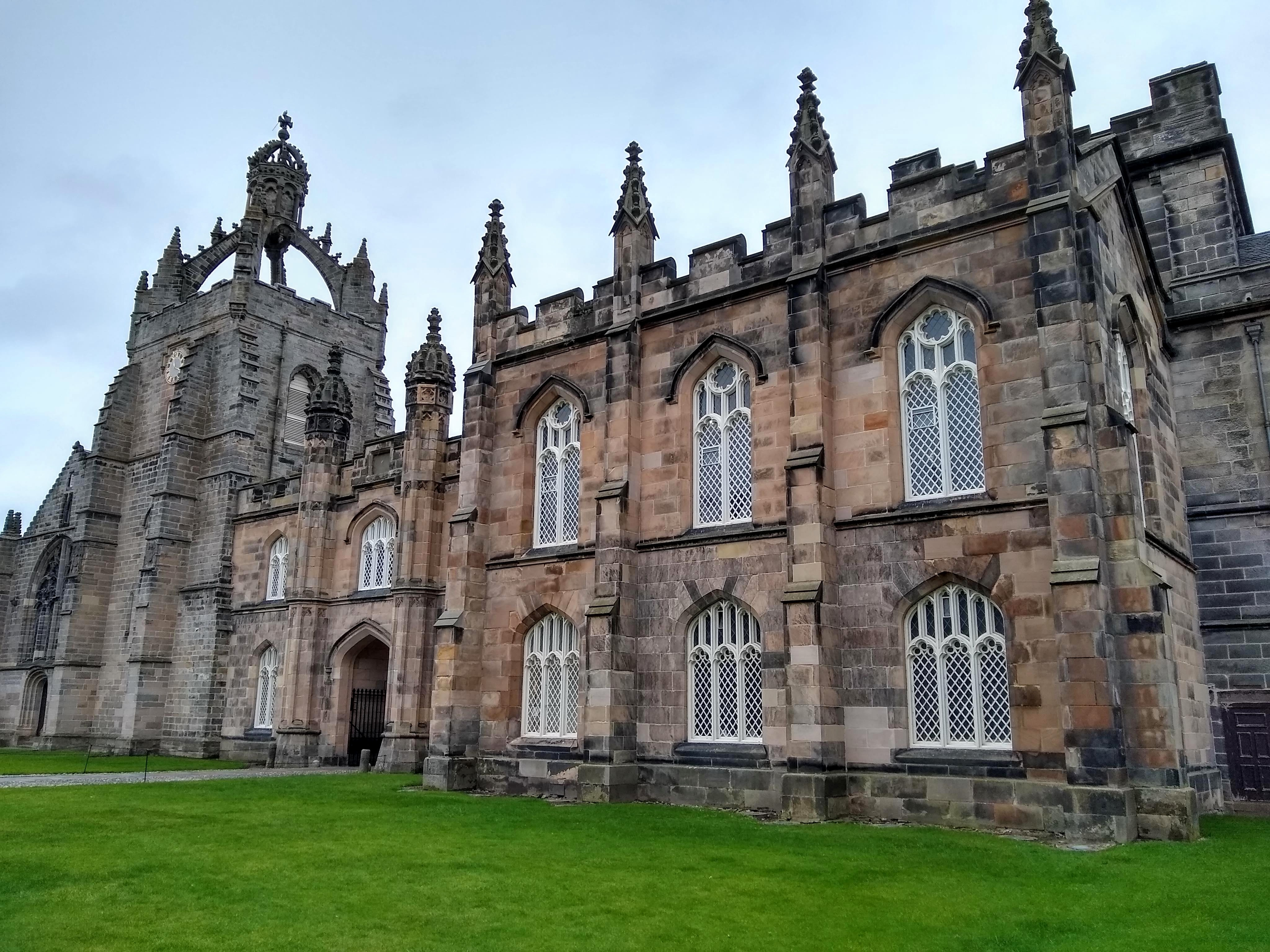
The University of Aberdeen in Aberdeen, Scotland

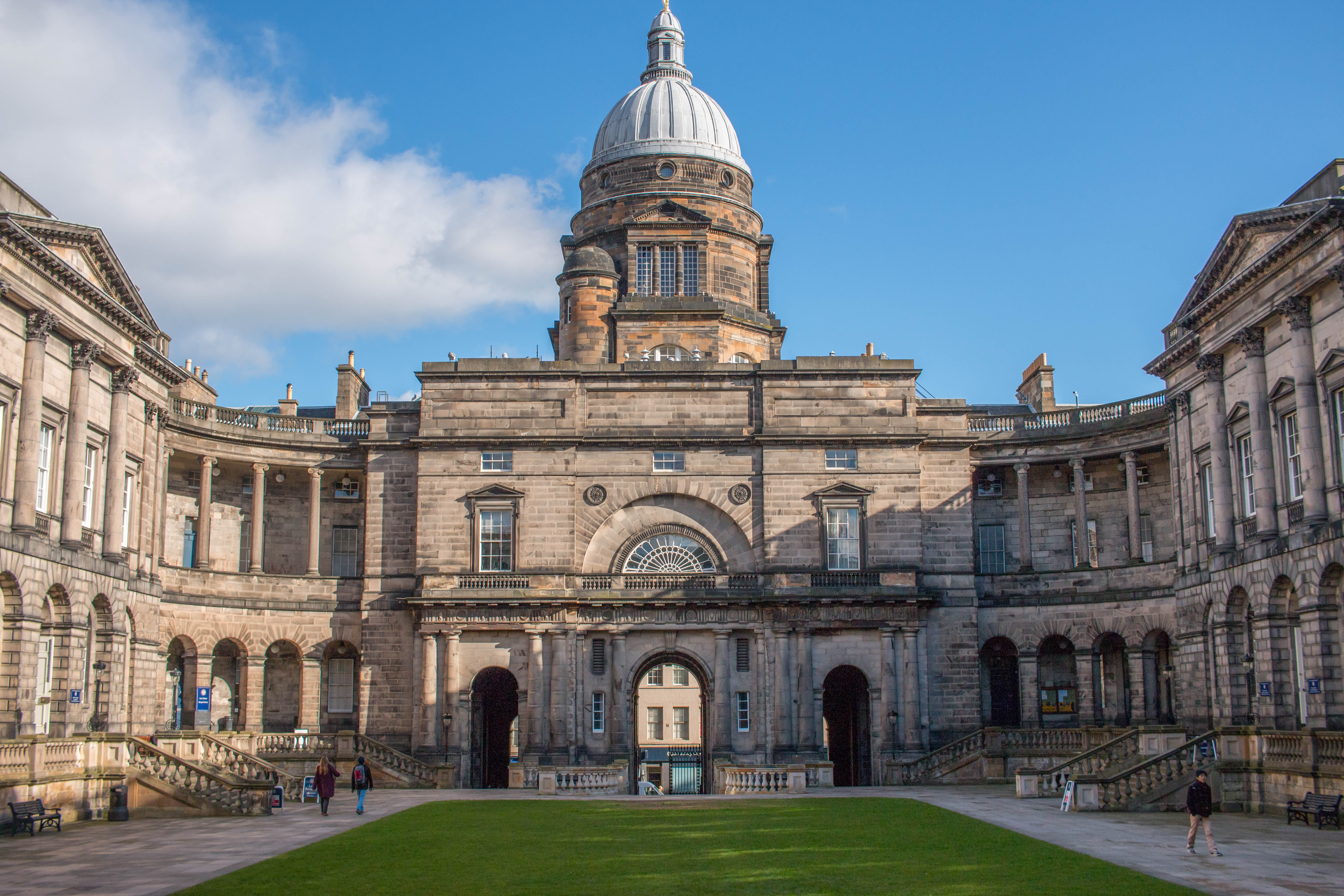
The University of Edinburgh in Edinburgh, Scotland

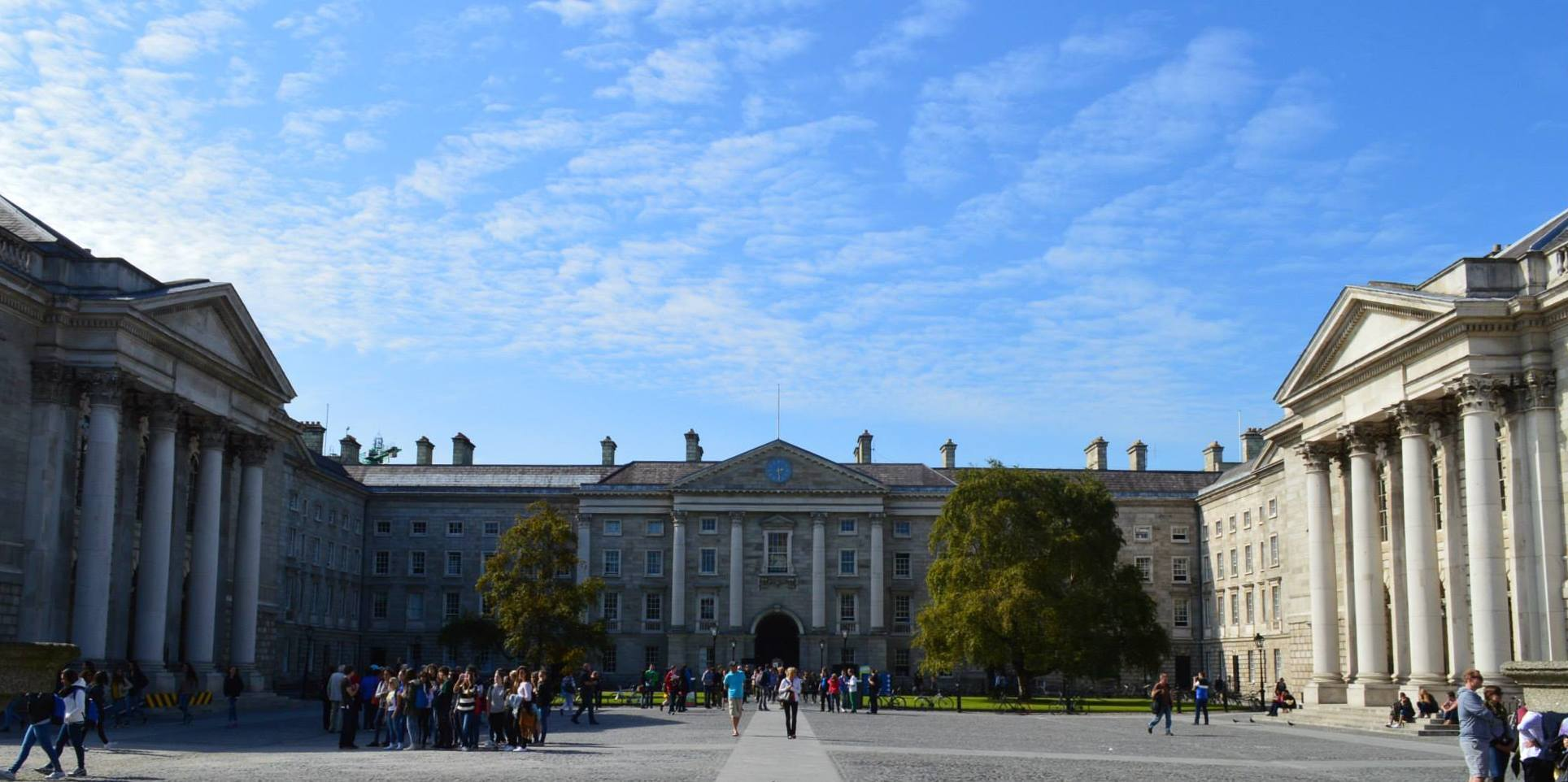
Trinity College Dublin Ireland

These universities are often governed in a quite different fashion to more recent foundations. The ancient universities of Scotland also share several distinctive features and are governed by arrangements laid down by the Universities (Scotland) Acts. In addition to these universities, some now-defunct institutions were founded during this period, including the University of Northampton (1261–1265), University of Stamford, Lincolnshire (1333–1335), and the University of Fraserburgh, Aberdeenshire (1592–1605). There was also the medieval University of Dublin which was an early but largely unsuccessful attempt to establish a university in Dublin, the capital city of the Lordship of Ireland. Founded in 1320, it maintained an intermittent existence for the next two centuries, but it never flourished, and disappeared for good at the Reformation in Ireland (1534–41). It was located in St Patrick's Cathedral, Dublin. It had no connection with the present University of Dublin, better known as Trinity College Dublin (its sole college), which was founded in 1592.

== Undergraduate Master of Arts degree ==
The ancient universities are distinctive in awarding the Magister Artium/Master of Arts (MA) as an undergraduate academic degree. This is commonly known as the Oxbridge MA, Trinity MA (Dublin), or the Scottish MA.

The ancient universities in Scotland confer the MA degree at graduation with honours and a final mark; in contrast, the ancient universities in England and Ireland award the MA purely after a period of good standing following graduation as Bachelor of Arts, usually around three years.

Because they award the MA as an undergraduate Arts degree, the ancient universities award differing titles for their postgraduate master's degrees in the Arts and Humanities, such as the taught Master of Letters ("MLitt (T)"). Some confusion can arise as to whether such degrees are taught degrees or the most established (and advanced) two-year research degrees, although this is often specified.

== Acts of Parliament related to the universities of Oxford and Cambridge ==
While both universities received grants of liberties and privileges by royal charter, the charters granted to Cambridge in 1231 and to Oxford in 1248 being the earliest recorded on the Privy Councils list of chartered bodies, neither university was created or incorporated by royal charter. After existing for the first few centuries of their existence as common law corporations, they were formally incorporated by the Oxford and Cambridge Act 1571, under Elizabeth I. The Universities of Oxford and Cambridge Act 1859 repealed the parts of the 1571 act that required the mayor, aldermen, citizens or municipal officer of the City of Oxford to take any oath for the conservation of the liberties and privileges of the University of Oxford.

Parliament passed the Chantries Act in 1545, which transferred ownership of all chantries and their properties to King Henry VIII. Members of the University of Cambridge sent letters to the king's wife, Catherine Parr, about the potential threat this posed to the university. It is evident that the king already had special plans for the universities of Oxford and Cambridge, and that they were given special treatment compared to the other schools of England. At Cambridge, for example, King Henry VIII founded Trinity College, which would later become an important part of the University.

In the 19th century a series of acts and commissions reduced the powers of the universities to make their own statutes. A Royal Commission in 1850 looked into both universities and proposed major reforms to their constitutions. These were enacted by the Oxford University Act 1854 and the Cambridge University Act 1856. The Universities Tests Act 1871 removed almost all religious tests from both universities (and from Durham University). The Oxford and Cambridge Universities Act 1877 set up commissioners to look into further reform of the statutes of both universities and of their constituent colleges. Further Royal Commissions into both universities were established in 1919, resulting in the Oxford and Cambridge Universities Act 1923, setting up a commission to again make statutes and regulations for the universities and their colleges. This has resulted in there being two kind of statutes at these universities – those made by the universities themselves, which may be changed by them, and the "Queen-in-Council" statutes made under the 1923 act or the Education Reform Act 1988 that can only be changed with permission from the Privy Council.

== Universities (Scotland) Acts ==
The Universities (Scotland) Acts created a distinctive system of governance for the ancient universities in Scotland, the process beginning with the 1858 Act and ending with the 1966 Act. Despite not being founded until after the first in these series of Acts, the University of Dundee shares all the features contained therein.

As a result of these Acts, each of these universities is governed by a tripartite system of General Council, University Court, and Academic Senate.

The chief executive and chief academic is the University Principal who also holds the title of Vice-Chancellor as an honorific. The Chancellor is a titular non-resident head to each university and is elected for life by the respective General Council, although in actuality a good number of Chancellors resign before the end of their 'term of office'.

Each also has a students' representative council as required by statute, although at the University of Aberdeen this has recently been renamed the Students' Association Council.

== Later universities ==
Following the creation of the ancient universities, no more universities were created in Britain and Ireland until the 19th century except three defunct universities in England (Northampton, Stamford and Durham), which were quickly shut down after opening due to strong opposition-lobbying efforts by Oxford and Cambridge.

Which of the 19th-century institutions should be considered the earliest post-ancient university is a matter of debate. The main university-level foundations up to the mid 19th century were:

- Durham College (1657–1660) founded under Oliver Cromwell, for which a charter as a university was drawn up under Richard Cromwell but never sealed
- St David's College, Lampeter by the Bishop of St David's in 1822 (royal charter 1828) (now part of University of Wales Trinity Saint David)
- University College London as a joint stock company in 1826 under the name "London University" (royal charter as University College, London 1836)
- King's College London by royal charter in 1829
- University of Durham by act of parliament in 1832 (royal charter 1837)
- University of London by royal charter in 1836
- Queen's College, Birmingham (now The Queen's Foundation) by royal charter in 1843
- Queen's College Belfast (now, Queen's University Belfast), Queen's College Cork (now University College Cork) and Queen's College Galway (now University of Galway) by royal charters in 1845
- Bedford College, London founded by Elizabeth Jesser Reid in 1849 and the first institution of higher learning for women in the British Isles; now part of Royal Holloway, University of London
- Queen's University of Ireland by royal charter in 1850, with the above Queen's Colleges as constituent institutions (dissolved 1882; replaced by the Royal University of Ireland, which was in turn replaced by the National University of Ireland and Queen's University Belfast)
- Catholic University of Ireland in 1851 (royal charter as University College Dublin 1908)
- Owens College Manchester in 1851, now the University of Manchester (via the Victoria University of Manchester)

Only Durham, London and the Queen's University of Ireland were recognised as universities at the time of their foundation, granting their first degrees in 1837, 1839 and 1851 respectively. Durham was a collegiate university, London was an examining board, and the Queen's University was a federal university. The other institutions, while teaching at university level, were colleges, some becoming universities later. In addition, many other universities trace their roots to institutions founded in this period, including the University of Strathclyde to the Andersonian Institute (1796), Heriot-Watt University to the School of Arts of Edinburgh (1821), Birkbeck, University of London to the London Mechanics' Institute (1823), the University of Manchester (via UMIST) to the Manchester Mechanics' Institute (1824) and (via Owen's College) to the Manchester Royal School of Medicine (also 1824), the University of Chester to Chester Diocesan Training College (1839), Plymouth Marjon University to St John's College, Battersea (1840) and St Mark's College, Chelsea (1841), the University of Winchester to Winchester Diocesan Training School (1840), the University of Roehampton to Whitelands College (1841), York St John University to York Diocesan College (1841) and the York Diocesan Institution for Female Teachers (1846), and St Mary's University, Twickenham to St Mary's College (1850). Many medical schools also date from the 18th century or earlier, including St Thomas's Hospital Medical School (now part of King's College London) between 1693 and 1709, St George's, University of London in 1733, Middlesex Hospital Medical School (now part of University College London) in 1746, London Hospital Medical College (now part of Queen Mary, University of London) in 1786.

The redbrick universities were established as university colleges in the latter half of the 19th century and mostly became universities in the early 20th century. The Royal University of Ireland (1881, as the successor of the Queen's University of Ireland), the Victoria University (1881), and the University of Wales (1893) were the only other universities established in the 1800s, all as federal or examining universities. The first unitary university in the British Isles outside of Scotland was the University of Birmingham (1900).

== See also ==
- List of oldest universities in continuous operation
- Ancient universities of Scotland, oldest universities in Scotland
- Colonial colleges, oldest universities in the United States of America
- Imperial Universities, oldest universities founded during the Empire of Japan
- Sandstone universities, oldest universities in Australia
