= Ancient universities of Scotland =

Medieval and renaissance universities

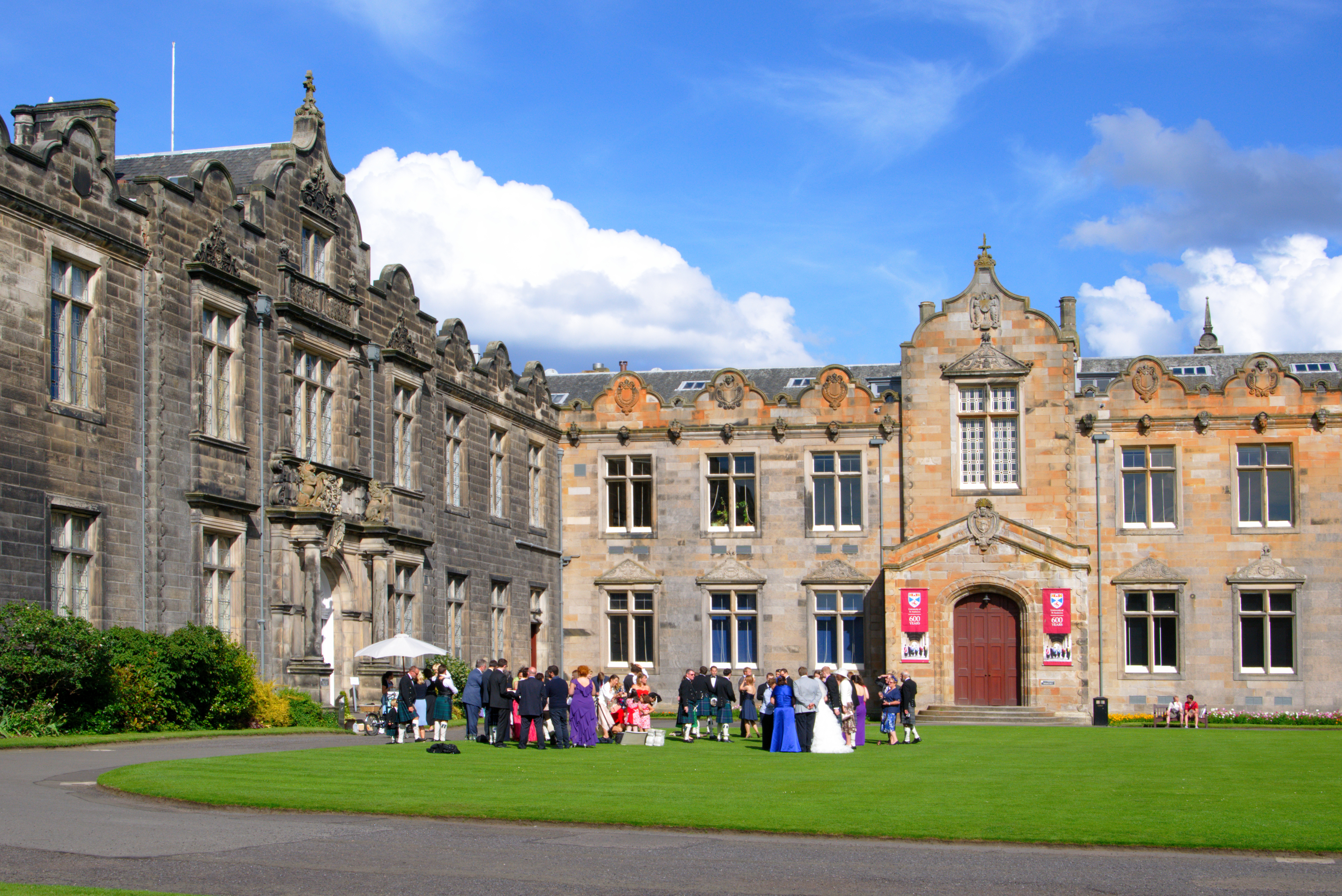
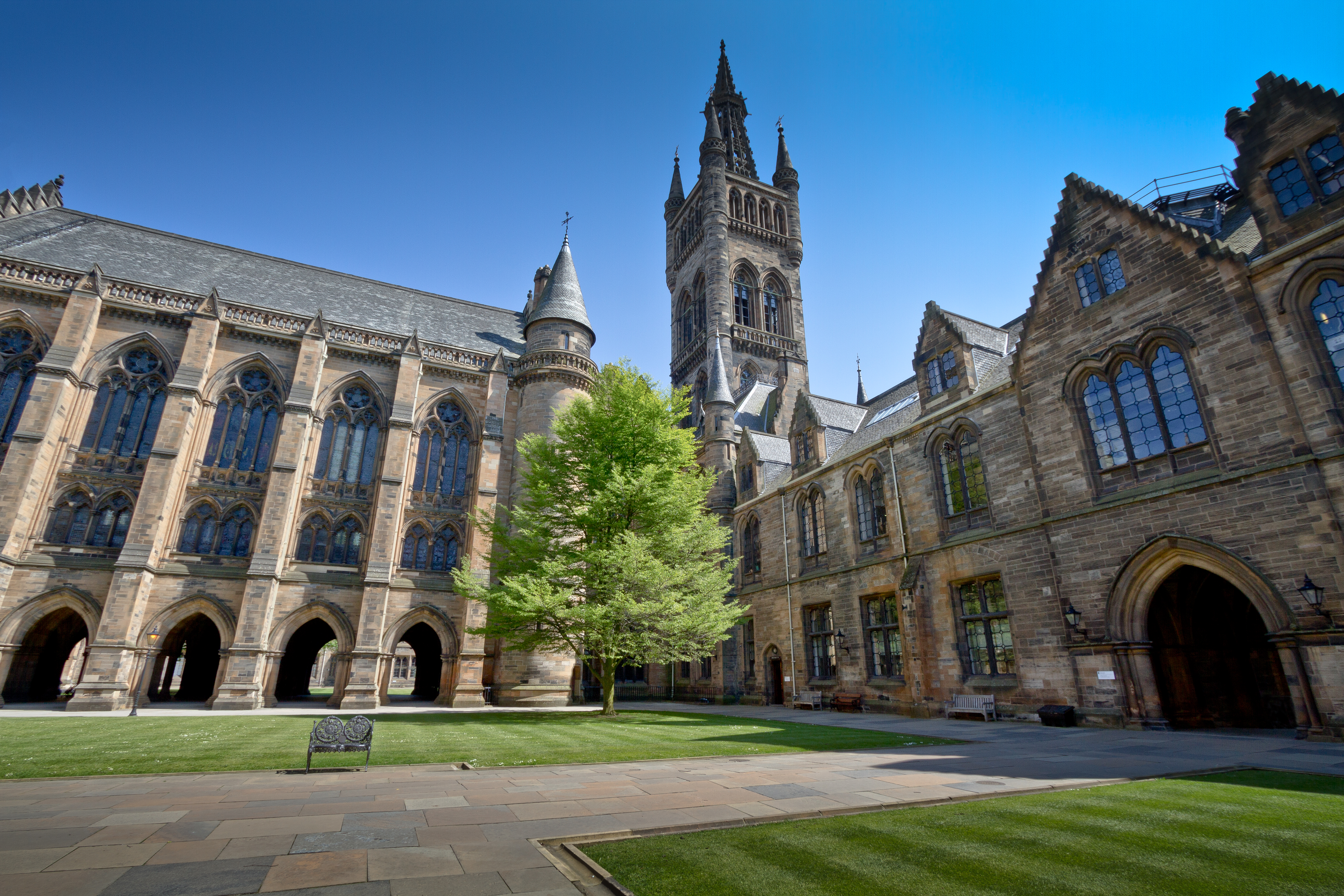
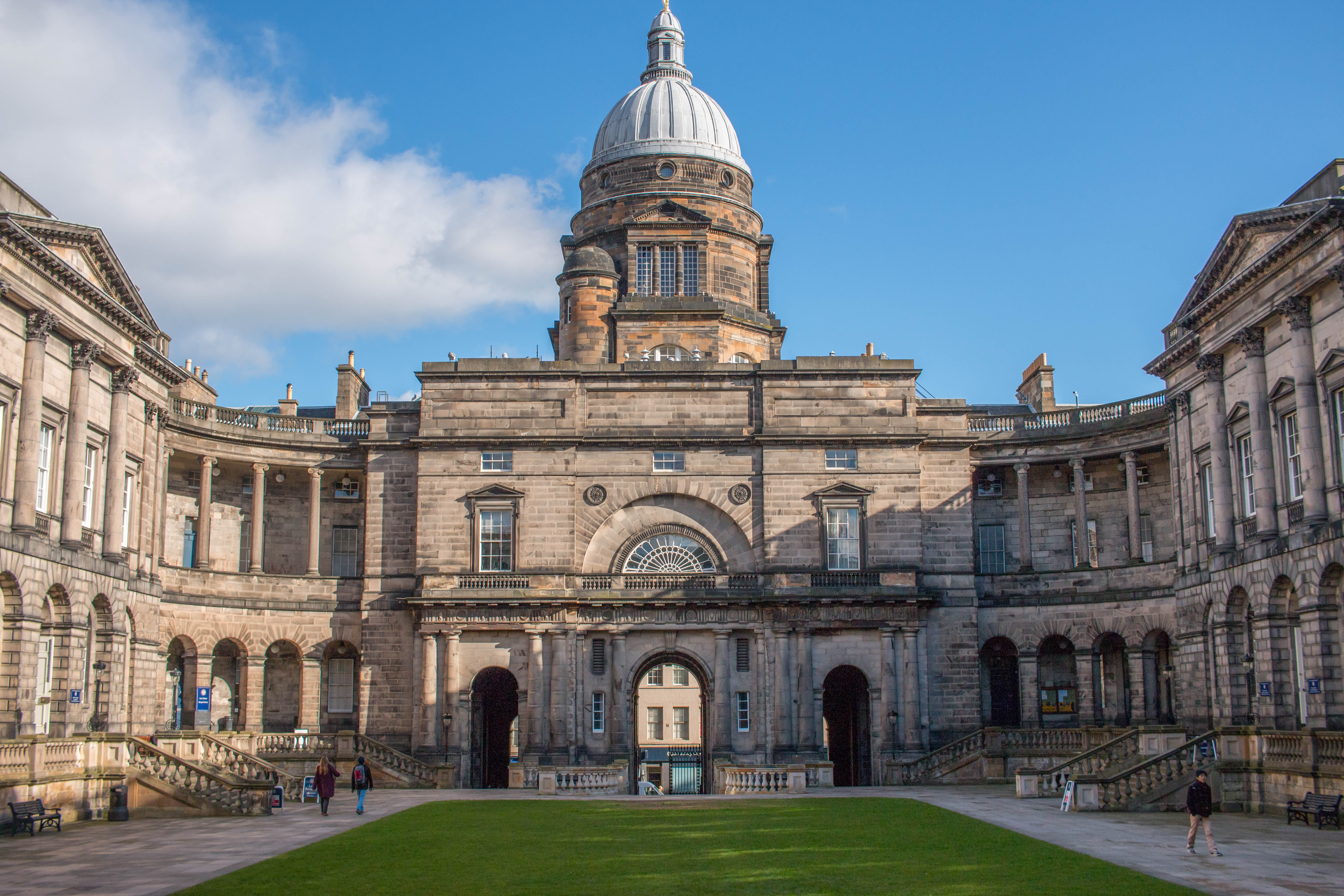
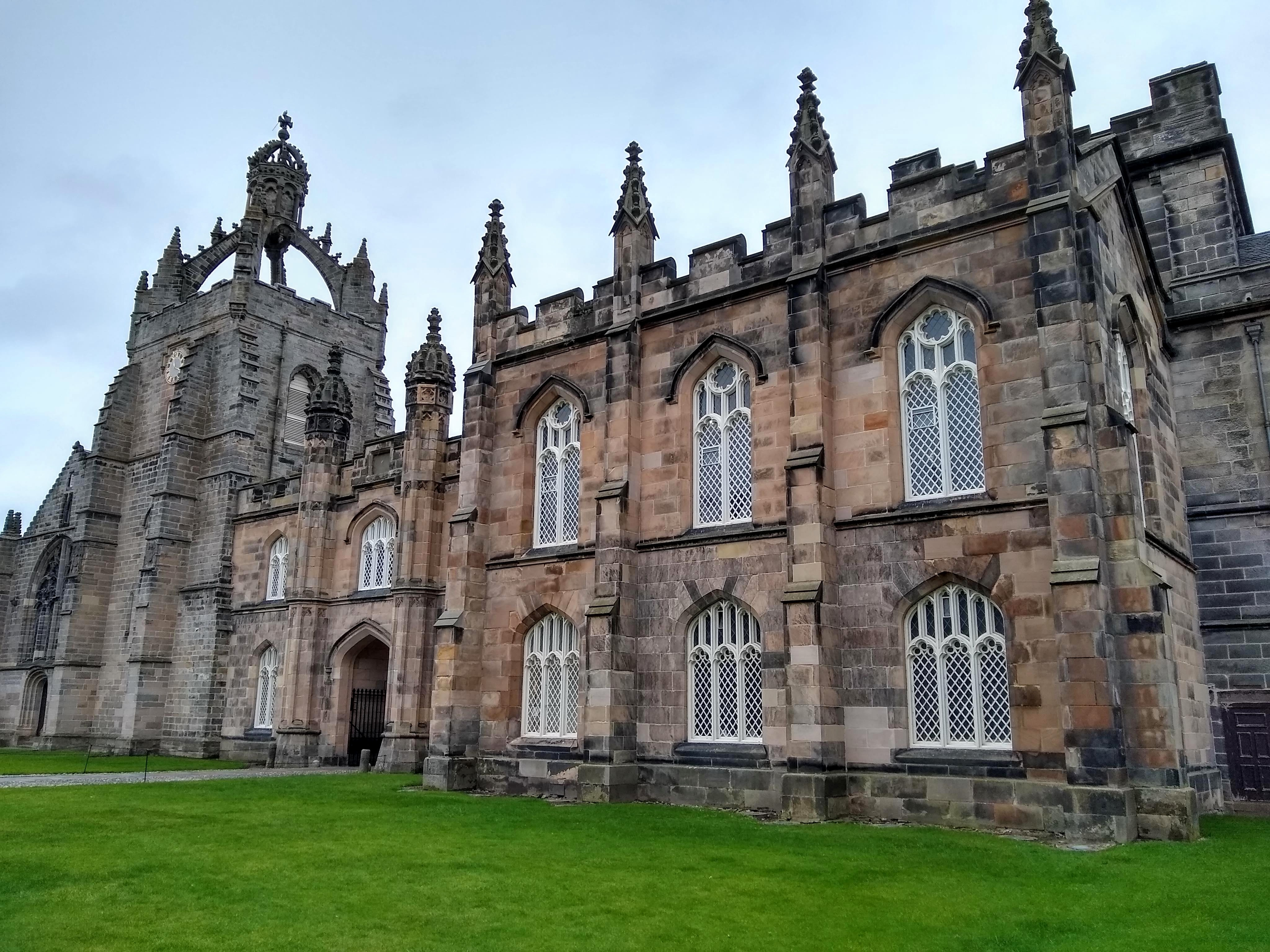
Ancient universities of Scotland. Clockwise from upper left: St Andrews, Glasgow, Aberdeen, Edinburgh.
Locations of the ancient universities

The ancient universities of Scotland (Scottish Gaelic: Oilthighean ann an Alba) are medieval and renaissance universities that continue to exist in the present day. Together, the four universities are the oldest universities in continuous operation in the English-speaking world after the universities of Oxford and Cambridge. The majority of the ancient universities of the British Isles are located within Scotland, and have a number of distinctive features in common, being governed by a series of measures laid down in the Universities (Scotland) Acts 1858–1966. The Universities (Scotland) Act 1966 uses the term 'older universities' to refer to St Andrews, Glasgow, Aberdeen and Edinburgh. The four universities are generally regarded as the country's most selective, eminent and well-ranked universities. (Note: rankings, eminent, and highly-selective)

In common with the other ancient universities of the United Kingdom, the Scottish ancients find themselves administered in a quite different fashion from the new universities (there are now fifteen universities in Scotland) and are granted a number of privileges as a result of their different status. The ancient universities are part of twenty-seven culturally significant institutions recognised by the British monarchy as privileged bodies of the United Kingdom.

== Foundation and development ==
The surviving ancient universities in Scotland are, in order of formation:

| Year | Name | Location | Notes |
|---|---|---|---|
| 1413; 613 years ago | University of St Andrews | St Andrews, Scotland | Founded by a papal bull building on earlier bodies established between 1410 and 1413, but officially recognized in 1413 |
| 1451; 575 years ago | University of Glasgow | Glasgow, Scotland | Founded by a papal bull of Pope Nicholas V |
| 1495; 531 years ago | University of Aberdeen | Aberdeen, Scotland | King's College was founded in 1495 by papal bull and Marischal College in 1593; they merged in 1860 |
| 1582; 444 years ago | University of Edinburgh | Edinburgh, Scotland | Established by the town council under the authority of a royal charter granted by James VI |

== Members ==
=== St Andrews ===
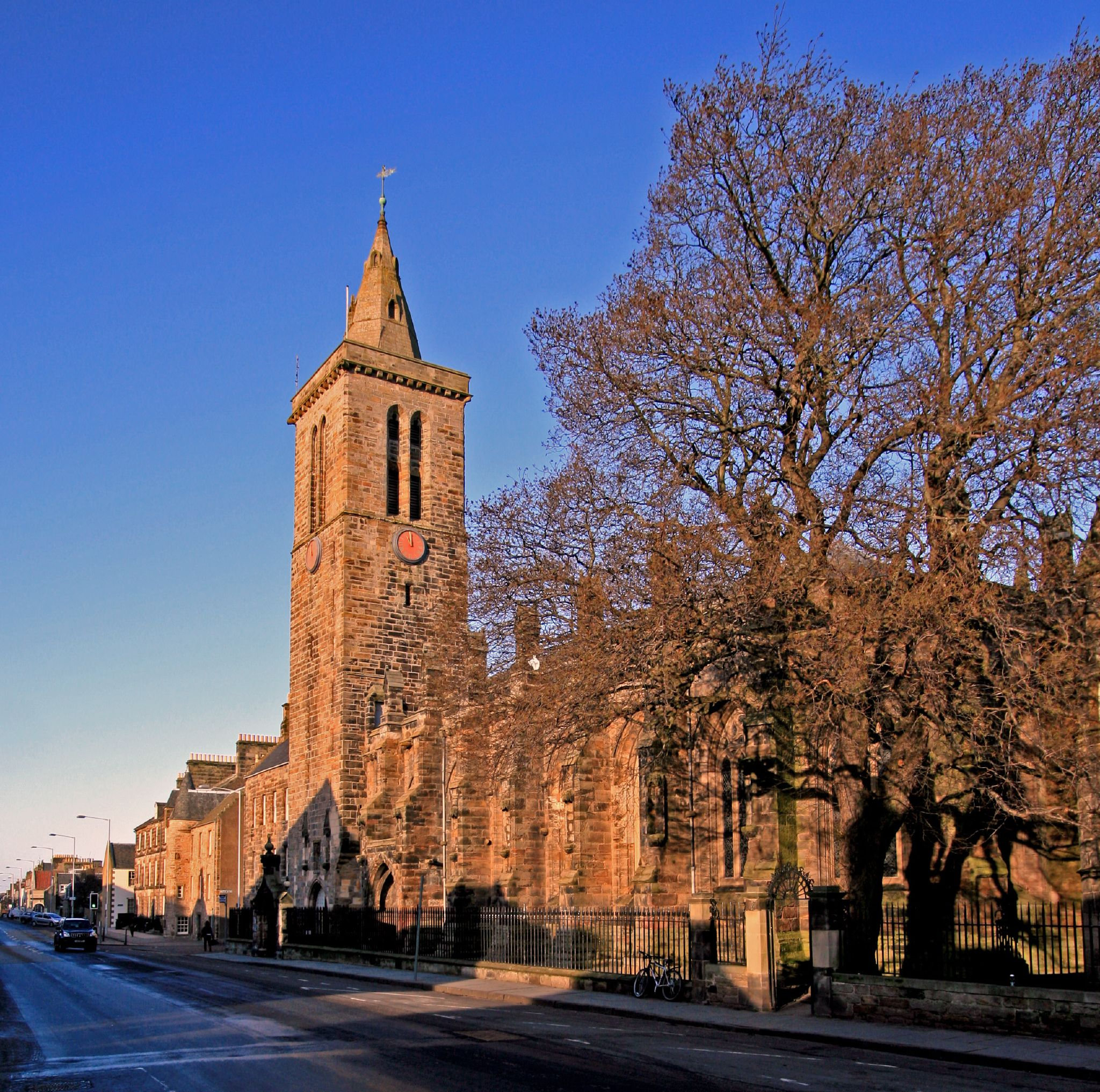
St Salvator's Chapel, St Andrews

The University of St Andrews traces its origin to a society formed in 1410 by Laurence of Lindores, archdeacon Richard Cornwall, bishop William Stephenson and others. Bishop Henry Wardlaw (died 1440) issued a charter in 1411 and attracted the most learned men in Scotland as professors. In 1413 Avignon Pope Benedict XIII issued six bulls confirming the charter and constituting the society a university.

All of the ancient universities with the exception of St Andrews were both universities and colleges, with both titles being used. However the University of St Andrews was a traditional collegiate university with a number of colleges. Today, only two statutory colleges exist: United College and the much smaller St Mary's College for students of theology.

In 1897 a third college was created when University College Dundee (founded in 1891) was incorporated and absorbed into St Andrews University (1897). University College subsequently became Queen's College (1954). In 1978 Queen's College separated from the University of St Andrews to become the independent University of Dundee. A fourth non-statutory college, St Leonard's College was founded in 1972 using the name of an earlier institution as a formal grouping of postgraduate students. In 2022, the university announced its intention to found New College, which would form a new hub for the schools of economics and finance, international relations, and management.

=== Glasgow ===
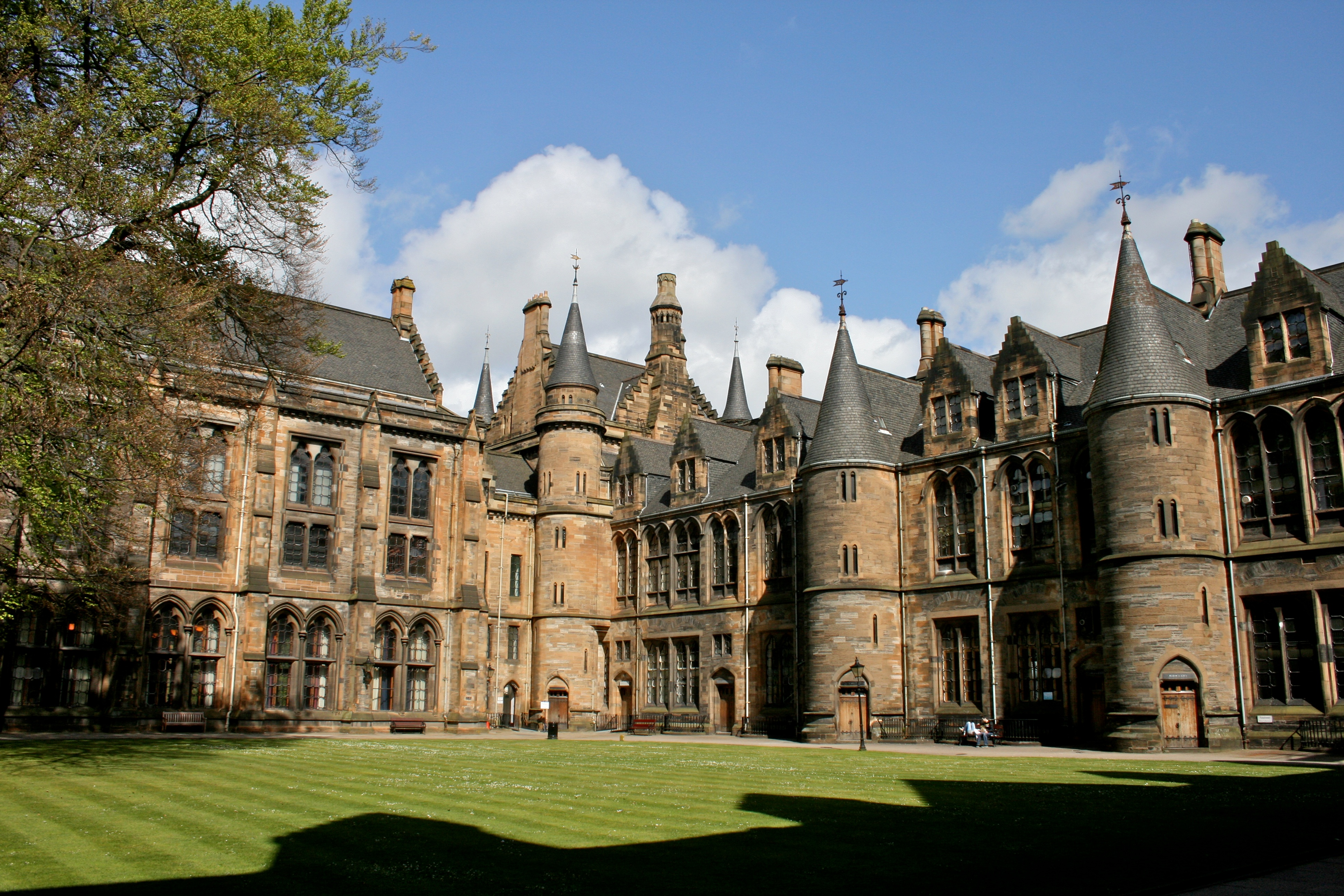
Gilmorehill campus, University of Glasgow

The University of Glasgow was founded in 1451 by a charter or papal bull from Pope Nicholas V, at the suggestion of King James II, giving Bishop William Turnbull, a graduate of the University of St Andrews, permission to add a university to the city's Cathedral. It is the second-oldest university in Scotland after St Andrews and the fourth-oldest in the English-speaking world. The universities of St Andrews, Glasgow, and Aberdeen were ecclesiastical foundations, while Edinburgh was a civic foundation. As one of the ancient universities of the United Kingdom, Glasgow is one of only eight institutions to award undergraduate master's degrees in certain disciplines.

=== Aberdeen ===
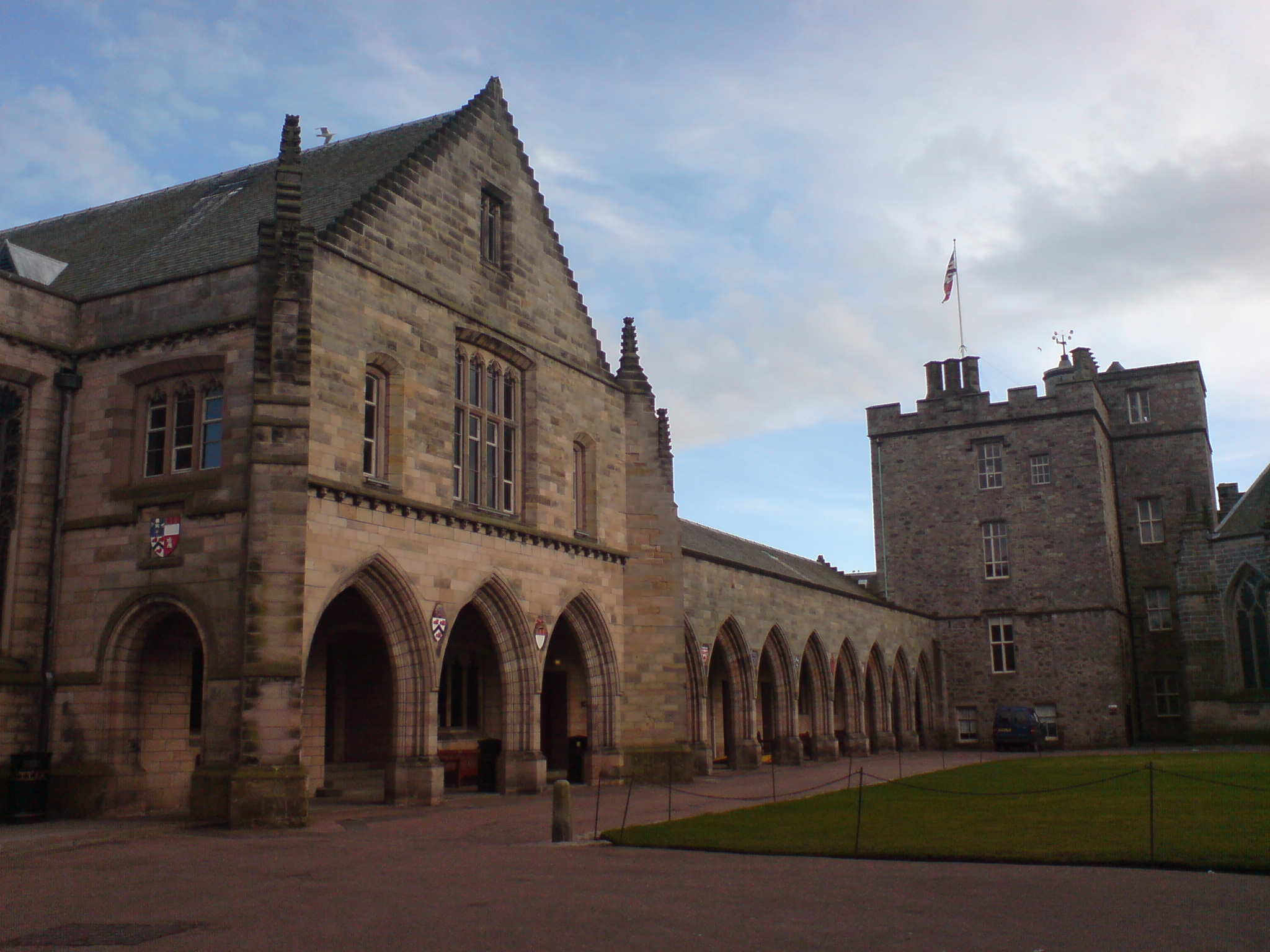
Elphinstone Hall, Aberdeen

No college is mentioned in the foundation bill, only a university and it was the "University of Aberdeen" by that name which was established in 1495. Subsequently, a single college, originally known as St. Mary of the Nativity, was established (it was founded by William Elphinstone, Bishop of Aberdeen, who drafted a request on behalf of King James IV to Pope Alexander VI which resulted in a papal bull being issued). Soon the entity came to be called King's College, after its royal founder James IV.

A separate university (Marischal College) was founded in 1593. In 1860, King's merged with Marischal College. While both institutions were universities and would be considered ancient, the act of parliament uniting the two specified that the date of the foundation of the new united university would be taken to be that of the older King's College.

Aberdeen was highly unusual at this time for having two universities in one city: as 20th-century university prospectuses observed, Aberdeen had the same number as existed in England at the time (the University of Oxford and University of Cambridge). In addition, Fraserburgh University was set up to the north of Aberdeen in Fraserburgh in 1595, but was closed down about a decade later. A further institute that was established in 1750 under the wishes of Robert Gordon, a wealthy University of Aberdeen alumnus, has since evolved into the modern Robert Gordon University.

=== Edinburgh ===
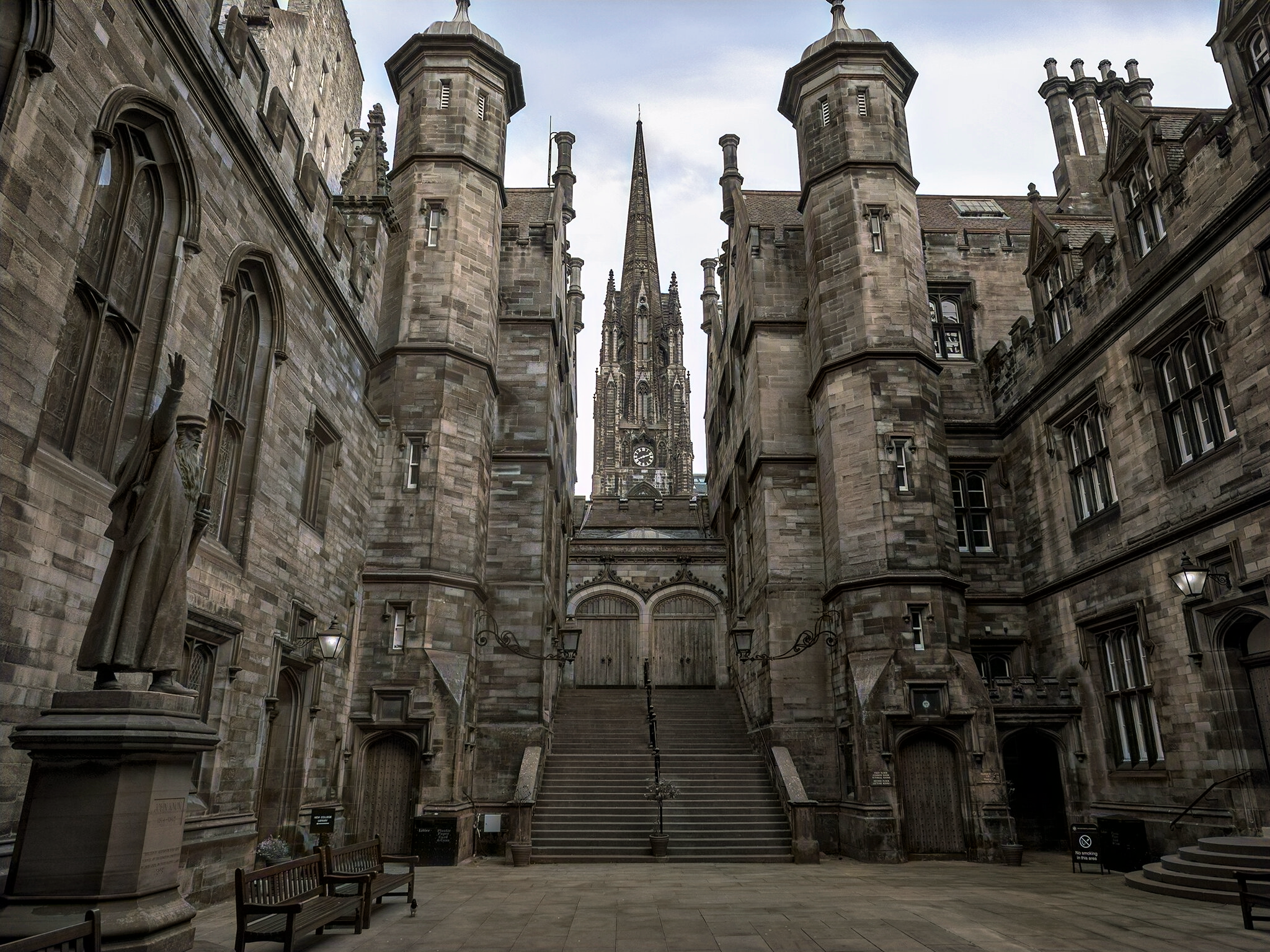
New College, Edinburgh

The University of Edinburgh was founded by the Edinburgh Town Council. The university was established by a royal charter granted by James VI in April 1582, and instruction began under the charge of theologian Robert Rollock in October 1583. As the first Scottish university to be founded by royal charter at the urging of the 'town council and burges of Edinburgh', rather than through papal bulls as had been the case for the three older universities, this set a new precedent. Despite this difference, it is universally considered one of the seven ancient universities of Britain and Ireland (and ten years older than the youngest ancient university, the Trinity College Dublin), a status affirmed by the Scottish Government.

== Anomalies ==
=== University of Dundee ===
The University of Dundee gained independent university status by royal charter in 1967, having previously been a college of the University of St Andrews. While not governed by the Universities (Scotland) Acts, the institution's Royal Charter provided for it to adopt the characteristics of ancient university governance such as the academic senate, awarding the undergraduate MA degree and electing a Rector.

As a consequence, some sources have grouped the University of Dundee among the ancient universities. The label has also been used by the university itself. In a Scottish Government report published in 2019, Dundee is classified as a 'Chartered' university, alongside Strathclyde, Heriot-Watt, and Stirling, as opposed to an 'Ancient' university.

At the installation of the university's Rector in 2007, the Principal and Vice Chancellor Sir Alan Langlands addressed the issue, noting:

'The position of Rector is something that Dundee shares with only four other universities in Scotland – the so-called "Ancient Universities". For Dundee to be classed with the "ancients" – at a relatively youthful age of forty – feels a bit like finding someone getting up to offer you their seat on the bus when you feel that you are still a bit on the young side. But we accept this "ancient" tag, with grace, as a mark of our history and distinction and a reinforcement of the University's commitment to student representation at levels.'

=== University of Aberdeen ===
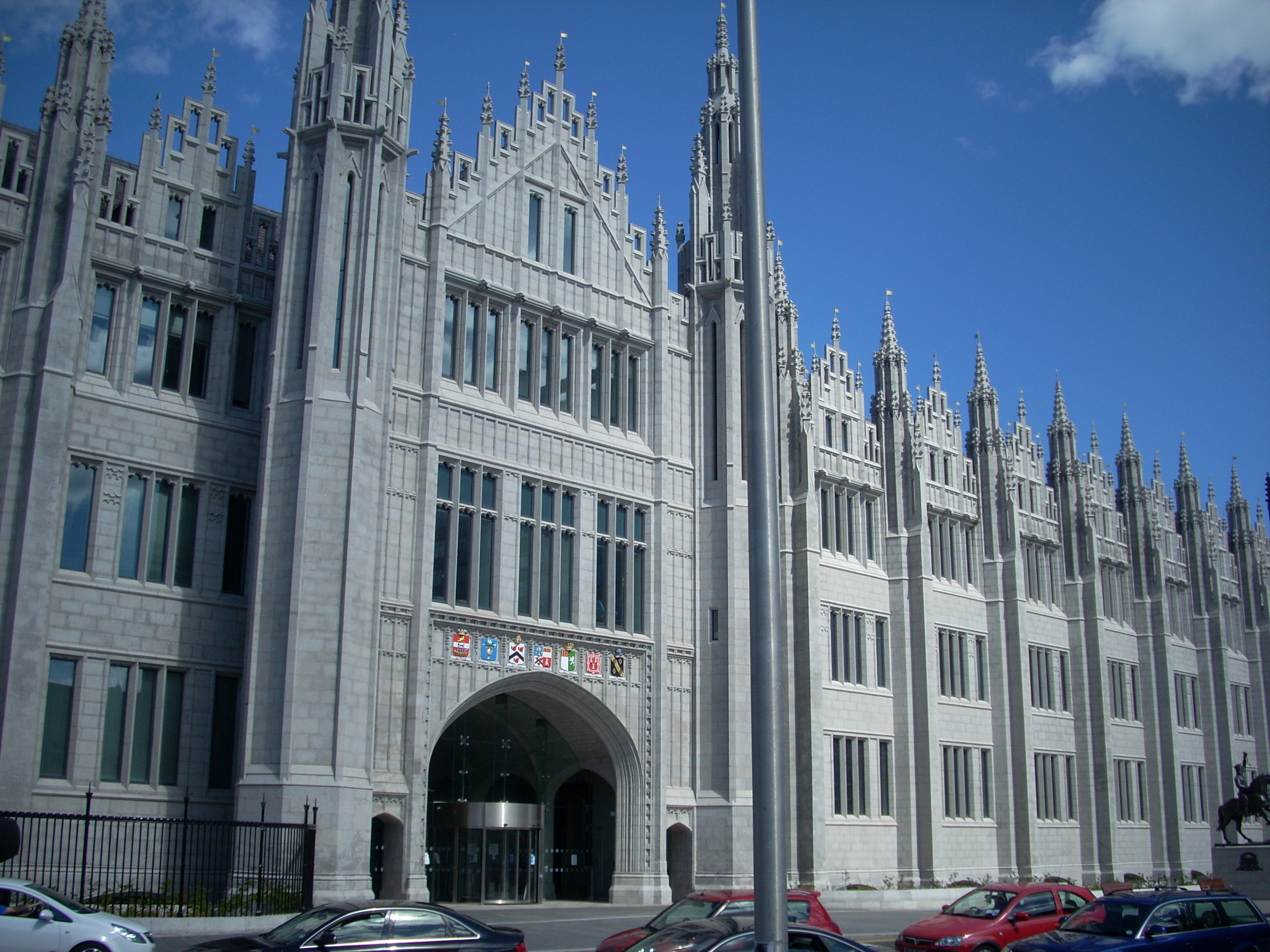
Marischal College, a former ancient university now part of the University of Aberdeen.

Despite being held as an ancient university, the University of Aberdeen was only created in 1860. The university was formed by the amalgamation of two existing ancient universities within Aberdeen, which were:

- University and King's College of Aberdeen; founded 1495
- Marischal College and University of Aberdeen; founded 1593

The two universities, generally known simply as King's College and Marischal College, were united into the modern University of Aberdeen by the Universities (Scotland) Act 1858. The act of parliament uniting the two universities specified that the date of the foundation of the new united university would be taken to be that of the older King's College, 1495. Another, short-lived, university existed in the Aberdeenshire town of Fraserburgh from 1595 to 1605 (University of Fraserburgh).

In modern times, former college names may refer to specific university buildings, such as the King's College and Marischal College buildings in Aberdeen, the Old College and New College at Edinburgh and the 'Old College' to refer to the former buildings of the University of Glasgow before its move in the 19th century to Gilmorehill.

== Undergraduate Master of Arts degree ==
The ancient universities are distinctive in offering the Magister Artium/Master of Arts (M.A.) as an undergraduate academic degree. This is sometimes known as the Scottish MA, though it is offered by fewer than a third of Scotland's Universities.

== Universities (Scotland) Acts ==
The Universities (Scotland) Acts created a distinctive system of governance for the ancient universities in Scotland, the process beginning with the 1858 Act and ending with the 1966 Act. Despite not being founded until after the first in these series of Acts, the University of Dundee shares all the features contained therein.

As a result of these Acts, each of these universities is governed by a tripartite system of General Council, University Court, and Academic Senate.

The chief executive and chief academic is the University Principal who also holds the title of Vice-Chancellor as an honorific. The Chancellor is a titular non-resident head to each university and is elected for life by the respective General Council, although in actuality a good number of Chancellors resign before the end of their "term of office".

Each also has a students' representative council (SRC) as required by statute, although at the University of Aberdeen this has recently been renamed, the Students' Association Council (the Students' Association having been the parent body of the SRC).

== Status ==
HESA Student Body (2024/25)
| University | Students | Students by domicile (%) | | |
| University | Students | Scotland | rUK | Non-UK |
|---|---|---|---|---|
| Aberdeen | 13,930 | 64.6% | 16.0% | 18.8% |
| Edinburgh | 39,015 | 30.4% | 26.2% | 41.6% |
| Glasgow | 38,710 | 51.0% | 13.4% | 35.9% |
| St Andrews | 11,645 | 28.2% | 25.7% | 46.1% |
| Overall | 103,300 | 42.5% | 20.5% | 36.9% |

=== Student body ===
In the 2024–25 academic year, 103,300 students were enrolled at the four institutions: 43,865 were from Scotland (42.5%), 21,170 from the rest of the United Kingdom (20.5%) and 38,105 were from overseas (36.9%).

The Scottish Government enforces a quota on the number of undergraduate places available for students from Scotland and as a result, entry to the four universities are selective. Entrance typically requires strong performances in standardised exams as represented by the average scores of new entrants when converted to UCAS points. All four universities were in the top ten British universities by entry standards for 2022 entry with Glasgow: joint 1st (along with Cambridge), St Andrews: 3rd, Edinburgh: 7th and Aberdeen: 10th.

Students from private education are over-represented at the ancient universities with the four universities hosting the highest proportion of privately educated students out of all Scottish universities in 2020/21 (St Andrews: 36.9%, Edinburgh: 35.5%, Glasgow: 16.1% and Aberdeen: 15.8%). St Andrews' and Edinburgh's higher proportion of private school students are due to the two universities recruiting "substantial numbers of students from the rest of the United Kingdom, many of whom come from prosperous English families and attended private schools" according to a report commissioned for the Scottish Government. In Scotland, around 4 per cent of the school-age population attend private schools and 11 per cent of all higher education students in Scottish institutions have attended private schools.

Domicile and ethnic background (2024/25)
| University | British White (Note: Not to be confused with solely White British) | British Asian | Black British | British Mixed Heritage | Other/ not known | International | |
| University | British White | British Asian | Black British | British Mixed Heritage | Other/ not known | EU | Non-EU |
|---|---|---|---|---|---|---|---|
| Aberdeen | 65% | 6.6% | 3.1% | 2.9% | 3.2% | 2.5% | 16.3% |
| Edinburgh | 46.8% | 4.6% | 1% | 3.5% | 2.5% | 5.4% | 36.2% |
| Glasgow | 51.5% | 4.4% | 1.3% | 2.4% | 4.3% | 3.1% | 32.7% |
| St Andrews | 42.9% | 4.4% | 1.2% | 3% | 2.2% | 8.6% | 37.5% |
| Scotland | 92.9% | 3.9% | 1.2% | 1.1% | 0.9% | —N/a | —N/a |
| Scotland | 89.8% | | | | | 4.3% | 5.9% |

=== Funding and finances ===
The total annual income for the ancient universities for 2023–24 was £2.911 billion of which £683.5 million was from research grants and contracts, with an operating surplus of £831.9 million. A total of £1.165 billion was from tuition fees and education contracts, with £94.6 million received from students domiciled in Scotland, £142.9 million from students from the rest of the United Kingdom and £861.5 million was received from overseas students. A further £511.5 million was received from funding body grants.

The universities hold a total endowment value of £1.034 billion and total net assets of £5.342 billion. The table below is a record of each ancient universities' financial data for the 2023–24 financial year:

| University | Government funding body grants (£m) | Scottish Teaching income (£m) | rUK Teaching income (£m) | non-UK Teaching income (£m) | Overall Teaching income (£m) | Research income (£m) | Total income (£m) | Operating surplus (£m) | Endowment value (£m) | Net Assets (£m) |
|---|---|---|---|---|---|---|---|---|---|---|
| University of Aberdeen | 76.8 | 17.9 | 11.7 | 60.3 | 91.3 | 56.9 | 264.0 | 75 | 65.3 | 431.0 |
| University of Edinburgh | 208.7 | 27.0 | 81.9 | 388.7 | 527.2 | 365.2 | 1,385.8 | 400.1 | 580.4 | 3,002.6 |
| University of Glasgow | 182.7 | 43.3 | 24.8 | 295.0 | 387.8 | 221.1 | 950.0 | 291.4 | 262.4 | 1,409.0 |
| University of St Andrews | 43.3 | 6.4 | 24.5 | 117.5 | 158.7 | 40.3 | 310.8 | 65.4 | 125.9 | 499.6 |

=== Rankings and reputation ===
In the 2026 national league table rankings, the ancient universities of Scotland are placed within the top twenty-five in both of The Guardian University Guide and in The Times/Sunday Times Good University Guide. In the 2026 global rankings, the ancient universities featured in the world's top 300 universities in both of the QS and the Times Higher Education World University Rankings.

| University | Complete 2027 (National) | Guardian 2026 (National) | Times/Sunday Times 2026 (National) | ARWU 2025 (Global) | QS 2027 (Global) | THE 2026 (Global) |
|---|---|---|---|---|---|---|
| University of Aberdeen | 32 | 18 | 23 | 201–300 | 288 | 201–250 |
| University of Edinburgh | 19 | 13 | 25 | 37 | 35 | 29 |
| University of Glasgow | 29 | 24 | 22 | 101–150 | 80 | 84 |
| University of St Andrews | 4 | 2 | 2 | 301–400 | 115 | 162 |

== Criticism ==
The ancient universities have faced criticism for their inability to attract more students from disadvantaged backgrounds. In 2014, approximately 48 per cent of the undergraduate population at the four universities comprises Scottish students, with over half of them having received their education from independent schools in Scotland. 71 per cent of independent school entrants gained a place in one of the four ancient universities, compared with only 29 per cent of state school entrants. In addition, fewer than one in seven students at the four ancient universities in Scotland are from working-class backgrounds. Alumni dominate the top levels of the civil service, law, politics, and media. Notably, more than half of Scotland's top media professionals and 46 per cent of the country's MPs are alumni of these universities. Graduates from the ancients hold a greater influence in the Scottish Government, with 90 per cent of cabinet members and 70 per cent of all ministers having attended one of the ancients. This has prompted claims of elitism, social division and the universities being less inclusive.

Following increasing pressures to address widening access concerns, in 2019, the Scottish Government ordered universities to create lower admissions thresholds for applicants from disadvantaged backgrounds. Alex Massie of The Times has commented that the new widening access targets for Scotland-domiciled students have now meant that there is "no chance" of admission into competitive courses at the ancient universities unless Scottish applicants have a widening access flag in their application. Scotland's Commissioner for Fair Access, Sir Peter Scott, had previously stated that middle-class Scottish students with strong academic results had "no entitlement" to enter ancient universities. Concerns over the Scottish Government's approach to funding has also led to accusations that the ancients are incentivised to attract students from the rest of the United Kingdom and from overseas, with all ancient universities of Scotland amongst the most reliant universities in the UK for teaching income from international students.

For the 2016-17 admissions cycle, ancient universities were criticised for the number of clearing places they had for Scottish students. Edinburgh offered 130 courses to students from the rest of the United Kingdom, but only one to Scottish students. Similarly, Aberdeen only offered one course in clearing for Scottish students but 79 for the rest of the UK, while Glasgow offered 5 and 497 courses respectively. St Andrews did not participate in clearing and offered no courses to either Scottish students or students from the rest of the UK.

== Later universities ==
Following the creation of the ancient universities before the end of the 16th century, no other universities were formed in Scotland until the twentieth century. The first 'new university' of the era was the University of Strathclyde which received its royal charter in 1964, although it traces its origins back to the Andersonian Institute (also known at various times as Anderson's College and Anderson's University) founded in 1796.

== See also ==
- List of oldest universities in continuous operation
- Ancient universities, oldest universities in Great Britain and Ireland
- Colonial colleges, oldest universities in the United States of America
- Imperial Universities, oldest universities founded during the Empire of Japan
- Sandstone universities, oldest universities in Australia
- Red Brick universities
- Plate glass universities
- List of universities in Scotland
- Ancient university governance in Scotland
