= Imperial Universities =

Group of universities in the former Japanese Empire

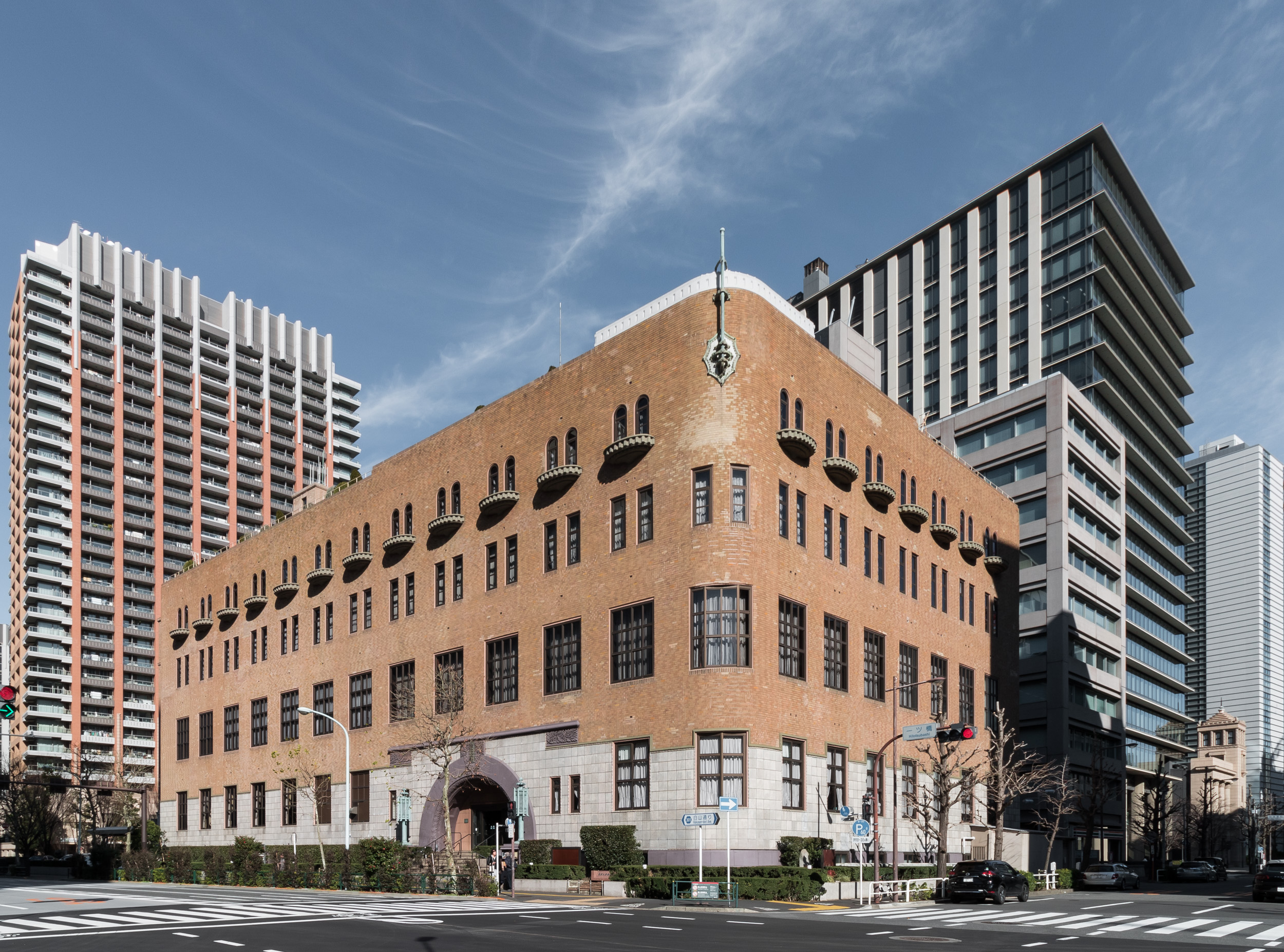
The Gakushi Kaikan, a club for members of the former Imperial Universities in Tokyo

The Imperial Universities (Kyūjitai: 帝國大學, Shinjitai: 帝国大学, teikoku daigaku; abbr.: 帝大 teidai) were founded by the Empire of Japan between 1886 and 1939, seven in Mainland Japan, one in Korea under Japanese rule and one in Taiwan under Japanese rule. These universities were funded by the imperial government until the end of World War II.

== Historical context ==
The name 'Imperial University' was initially used by what is now the University of Tokyo, the nation's first university. Although it was originally established under its current name, the Meiji government renamed it in 1886. In 1897, when it was decided to establish the nation's second university in Kyoto, the original Imperial University was renamed Tokyo Imperial University. Meanwhile, the newly established university was named Kyoto Imperial University.

Unlike in North America but similar to (continental) Europe, modern higher education in Japan mostly originated as national projects. There had been no private universities in Japan until 1920, when Keio and Waseda were granted university status. Thus, for the majority of its pre-war history, Japan's political, business and academic establishment predominantly consisted of alumni of the Imperial Universities and universities abroad, which further strengthened the prestige and power of these universities.

Today, these universities are no longer 'imperial', as Japan ceased to be an empire after the loss of World War II, and are often described as the former Imperial Universities (旧帝国大学, kyū-teikoku daigaku; abbr. : 旧帝大 kyū-teidai). They are viewed as some of the most prestigious in Japan. These former imperial universities are generally perceived as Japan's equivalent of the Ivy League in the United States, Golden Triangle in the United Kingdom, and the C9 League in China. The alumni club of these nine imperial universities is called Gakushikai (学士会).

Unlike Taihoku Imperial University (renamed in 1945 to National Taiwan University) in then-Japanese Taiwan, the Keijō Imperial University in then-Japanese Korea was closed by the United States Army Military Government in Korea (USAMGIK) with U.S. Military Ordinance No. 102. Seoul National University was built by merging nine schools in Seoul and the remaining properties of Keijō Imperial University (Kyŏngsŏng University). The National Taiwan University and Seoul National University are today among the most prestigious universities of Taiwan and Korea.

== Members ==
Imperial Universities			Successor universities			World university rankings		
Founded	Name	Image	Present-day name	Location	Colors	THE (2025)	ARWU (2024)	QS (2025)
1877	Imperial University (帝國大學), renamed Tōkyō Imperial University (東京帝國大學) in 1897		University of Tokyo (東京大学)	Bunkyō, Tokyo		28	28	32
1897	Kyōto Imperial University (京都帝國大學)		Kyoto University (京都大学)	Kyoto, Kyoto		55	45	50
1907	Tōhoku Imperial University (東北帝國大學)		Tohoku University (東北大学)	Sendai, Miyagi		120	201–300	107
1911	Kyūshū Imperial University (九州帝國大學)		Kyushu University (九州大学)	Fukuoka, Fukuoka		301–350	201–300	167
1918	Hokkaidō Imperial University (北海道帝國大學)		Hokkaido University (北海道大学)	Sapporo, Hokkaidō		351–400	201–300	173
1924	Keijō Imperial University (京城帝國大學)		Closed in 1946, properties and faculties succeeded by Seoul National University (서울대학교)	Seoul	Closed	62 (Seoul National University)	86 (Seoul National University)	31 (Seoul National University)
1928	Taihoku Imperial University (臺北帝國大學)		National Taiwan University (國立臺灣大學)	Da'an, Taipei		172 (National Taiwan University)	201–300 (National Taiwan University)	68 (National Taiwan University)
1931	Ōsaka Imperial University (大阪帝國大學)		University of Osaka (大阪大学)	Suita, Osaka		162	201–300	86
1939	Nagoya Imperial University (名古屋帝國大學)		Nagoya University (名古屋大学)	Nagoya, Aichi		201–250	101–150	152

== Locations (present-day Japan) ==
Locations of Imperial Universities in Japan

== Athletic competition ==
The universities are notable for hosting special-rules judo competitions called Nanatei Judo (ja:七帝柔道, Seven Emperors Judo) since 1952. In 1962, the athletic competition expanded under the sponsorship of Hokkaido University, formerly known as the National Athletic Competition of the Seven Universities (全国七大学総合体育大会, zenkoku nana-daigaku sōgō taiiku-taikai), its name was later changed to the Seven Universities Athletic Meet in 2002. The competition is commonly called the Competition of the Seven Imperial Universities (七帝戦, shichi-tei sen) or the national athletic meet of the seven former imperial universities (七大戦, Nanadai-sen).

== See also ==
- Higher school (Japan)
- Designated National University
- List of oldest universities in continuous operation
- Ancient universities, oldest universities in Great Britain and Ireland
- Ancient universities of Scotland, oldest universities in Scotland
- Colonial colleges, oldest universities in the United States of America
- Ivy League, overlapping with the Colonial colleges, a group of elite universities in the United States
- Sandstone universities, oldest universities in Australia
- Group of Eight, formal group of eight universities in Australia
- Institutes of National Importance, group of premier universities in India
- TU9, alliance of nine leading Technical Universities in Germany
- C9 League, Chinese state group of elite universities
- SKY (universities), group of prestigious Korean universities
