= Sandstone universities =

Group of Australia's oldest universities

Location of Sandstone Universities across Australia

The sandstone universities are an informally defined group comprising Australia's oldest tertiary education institutions. Most were founded in the colonial era, the exceptions being the University of Queensland (1909) and University of Western Australia (1911).

All the universities in the group have buildings constructed primarily of sandstone. Membership of the group is based on age; some universities, such as the private Bond University, have sandstone-plated buildings but are not considered sandstone universities. Additionally, Griffith University will operate out of the heritage-listed Treasury Building in Brisbane from 2027. However, the university was established in 1971, and thus, is regarded as a verdant university.

The label "sandstone university" is not completely synonymous with membership of the Group of Eight, which includes the Australian National University, Monash University and the University of New South Wales, but not the University of Tasmania. Nevertheless, the connotations (prestige, a focus on research and curricula that have a strong emphasis on theory rather than practice) are much the same for the two groups. Australian Government survey data of university graduates has indicated in the past that students who enter the sandstone universities come from higher-income families, and that graduates largely have higher paid occupations or positions of influence, prompting claims of elitism and social division.

== Constituent institutions ==
Sandstone universities can be taken to be either universities founded before World War I, or the oldest university in their respective state; either definition gives the same set of universities.

University	Location	Established	Undergraduates	Postgraduates	Endowment	Academic staff	Colours
University of Adelaide	Adelaide, South Australia	1874	20,005	7,352	$929 million	1,481	
University of Melbourne	Melbourne, Victoria	1853	26,751	22,543	$1.335 billion	4,631	
University of Queensland	Brisbane, Queensland	1909	35,076	18,620	$224.3 million	2,908	
University of Sydney	Sydney, New South Wales	1850	35,351	25,958	$2.5 billion	3,743	
University of Tasmania	Hobart, Tasmania	1890	27,880	5,999	$561 million	1,255	
University of Western Australia	Perth, Western Australia	1911	19,839	5,967	$709 million	1,538	

== Gallery ==
Sandstone universities

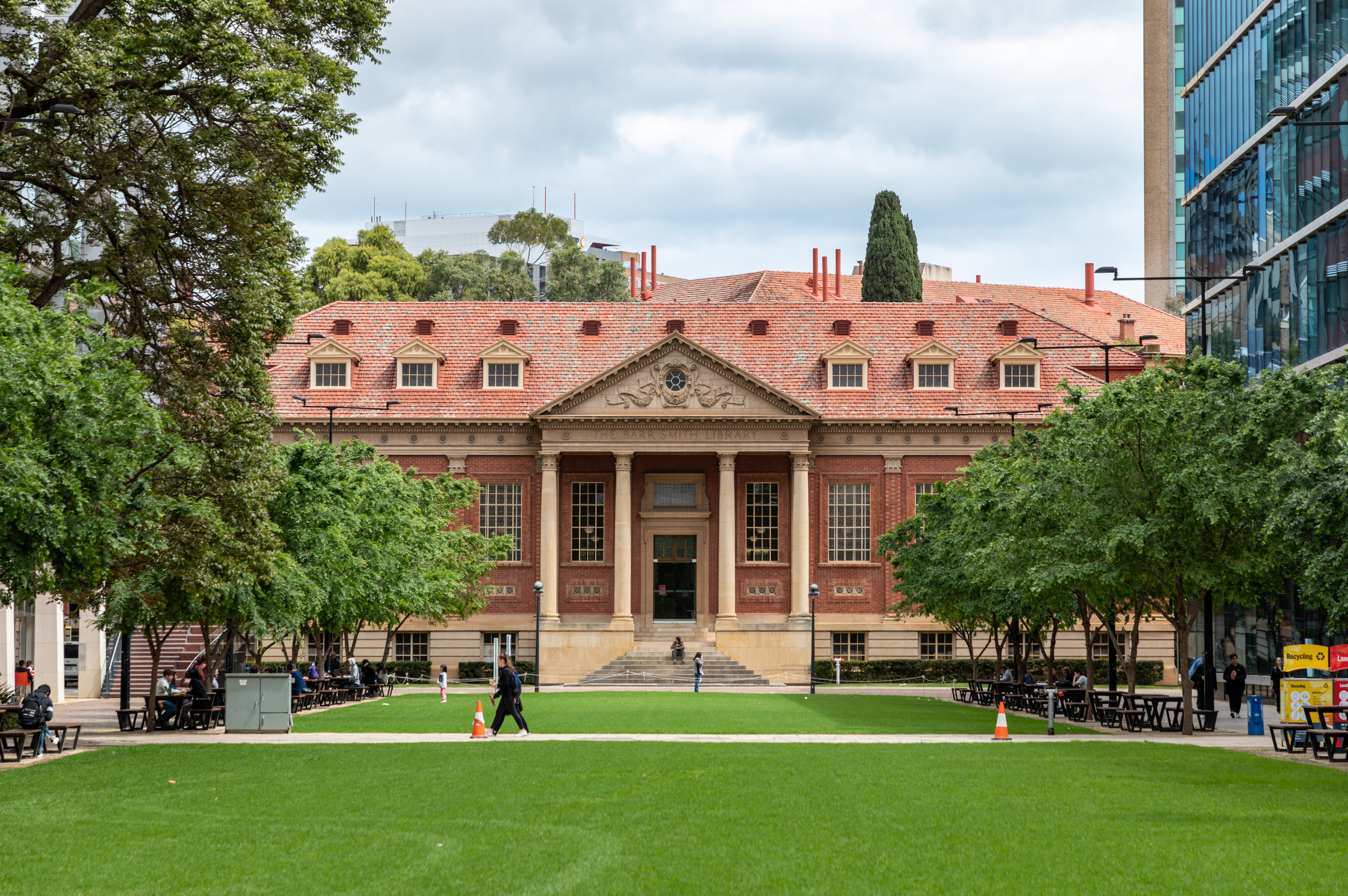
Barr Smith Library, University of Adelaide

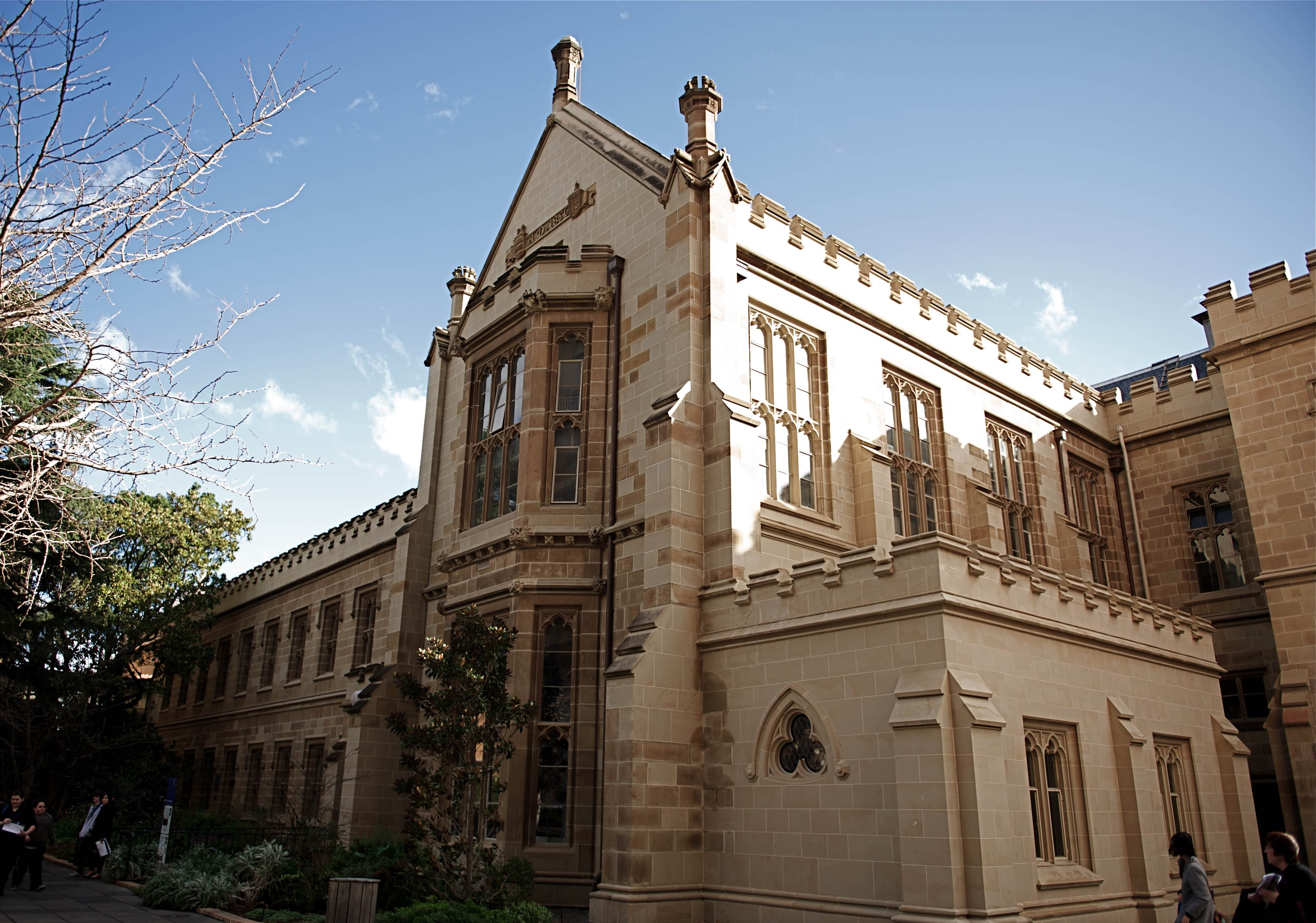
Old Quad, University of Melbourne

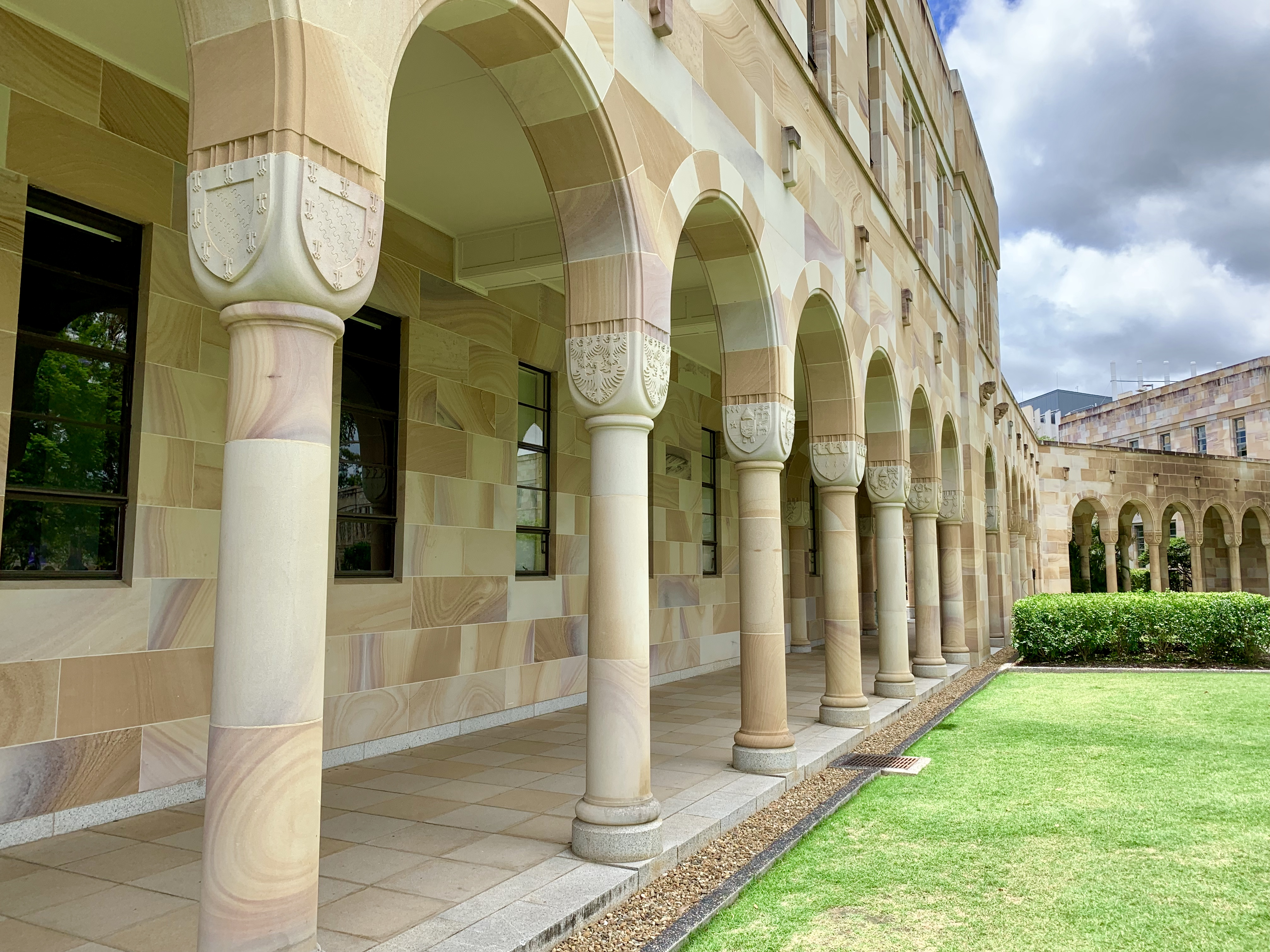
Great Court, University of Queensland

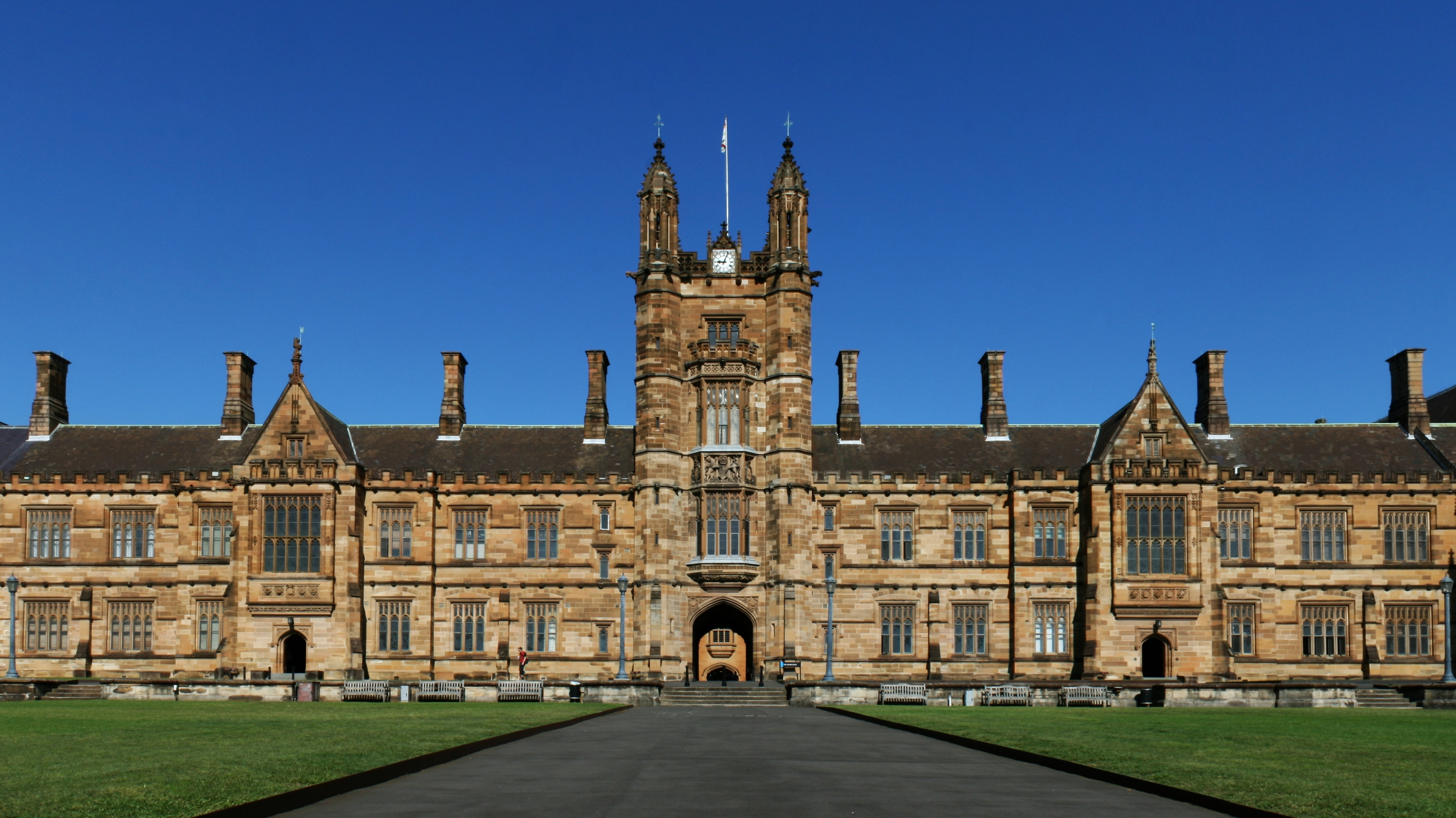
Main Quadrangle, University of Sydney

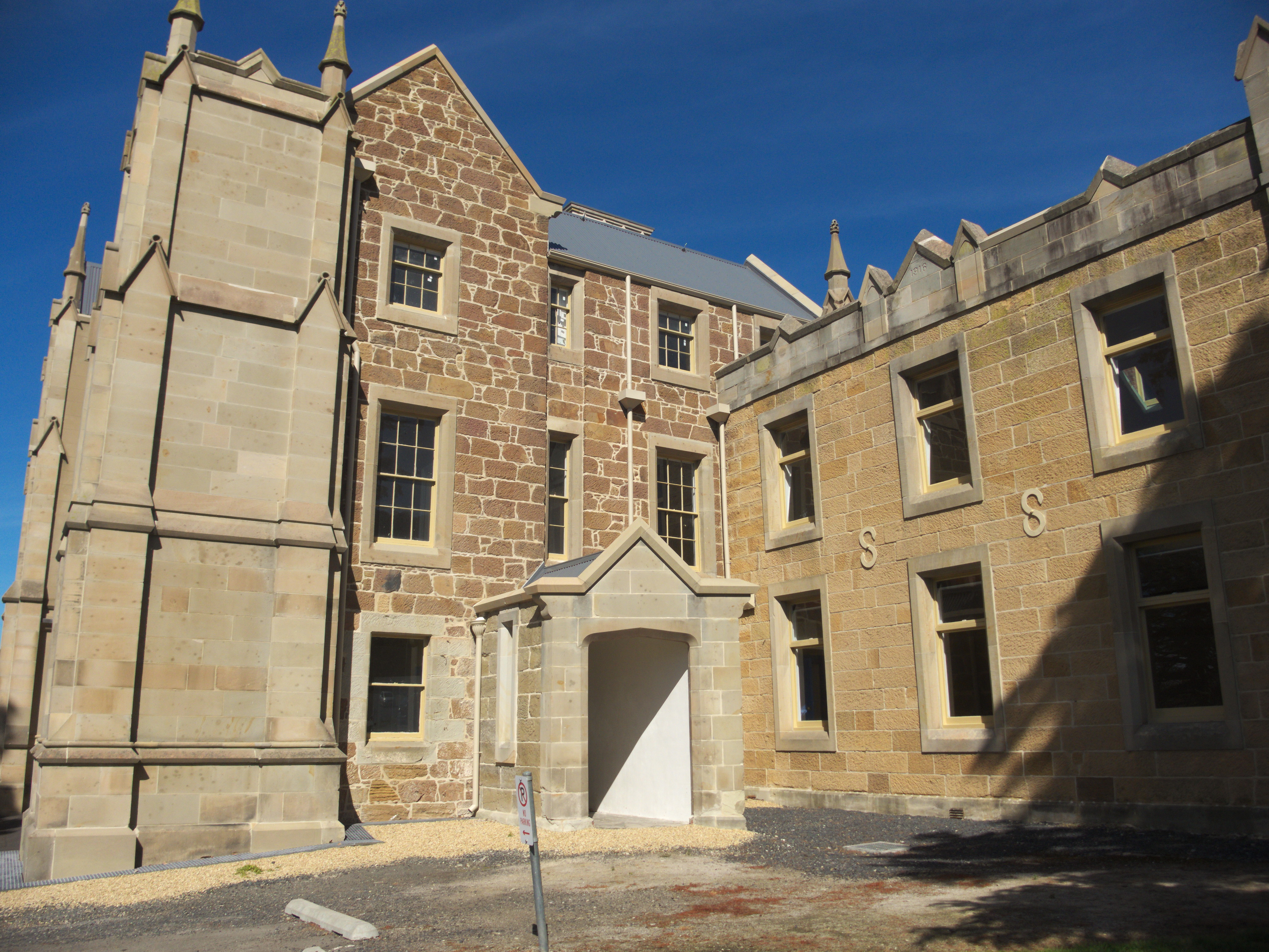
Domain House, University of Tasmania

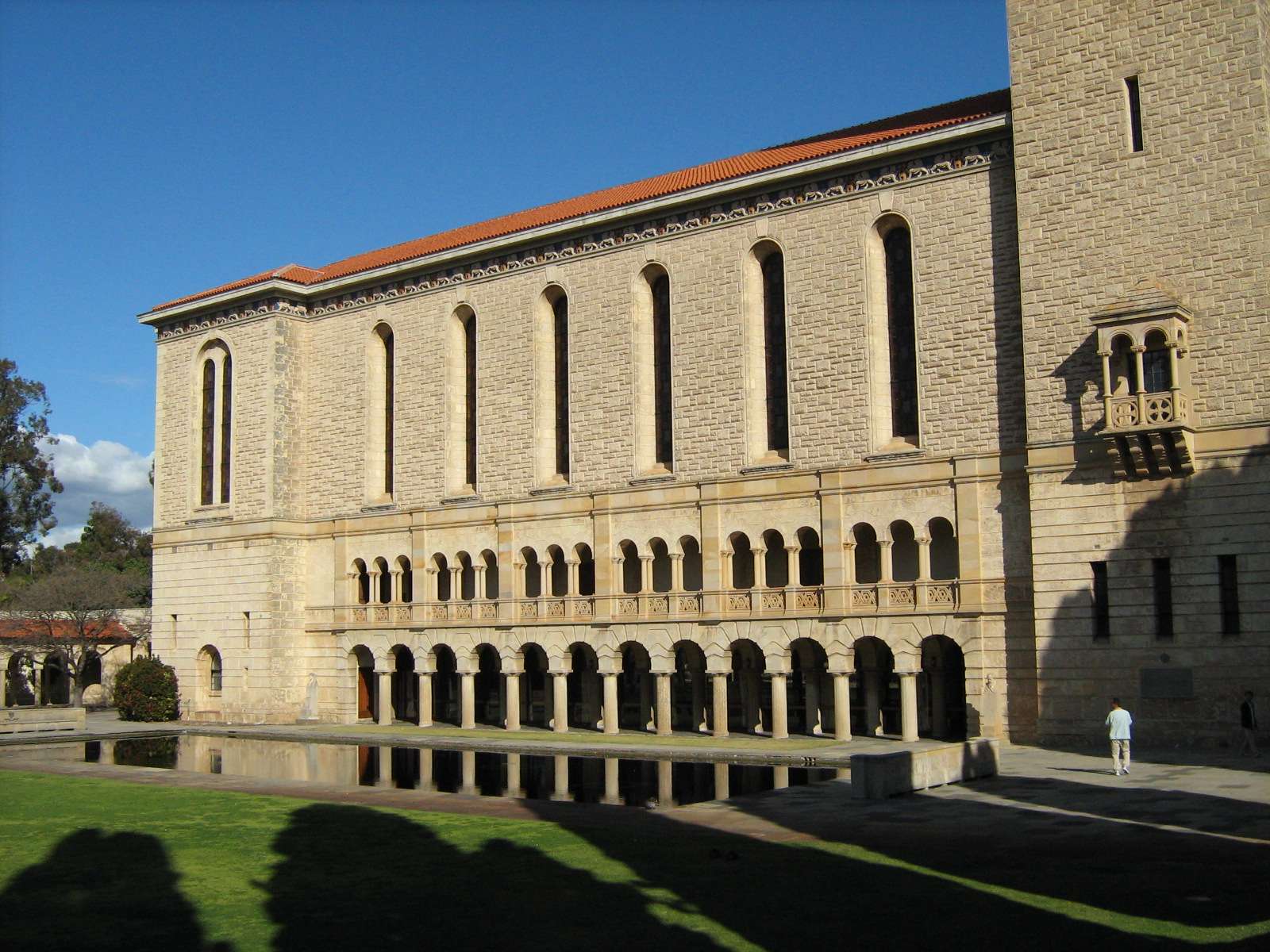
Winthrop Hall, University of Western Australia

== Other Australian university groups ==
=== Red brick universities ===
The University of New South Wales, Monash University and the Australian National University have been termed 'red brick' universities. They are similar to the red brick universities in the UK, both groups coming after the ancient universities and sandstone universities.

=== Verdant (gumtree) universities ===
Universities founded in the 1960s and 1970s have been known informally as "verdant" or "gumtree" universities. These universities were established in their state capitals, often next to native bush land (now nature reserves), and have lush vegetative campuses. They are predominantly the second or third established university in their state.

== See also ==
- List of oldest universities in continuous operation
- Ancient universities, oldest universities in Great Britain and Ireland
- Ancient universities of Scotland, oldest universities in Scotland
- Colonial colleges, oldest universities in the United States of America
- Imperial Universities, oldest universities founded during the Empire of Japan

== Bibliography ==
- Walden, Scott & Douglas South Australia - Three Universities 2003
- Australian Colonial Period - 1788-1901
