= Oxford and Cambridge Act 1571 =

Act of the Parliament of England

Oxford and Cambridge Act 1571 (Note: The citation of this act by this short title was authorised by section 5 of, and the second schedule to, the Statute Law Revision Act 1948. Due to the repeal of those provisions, it is now authorised by section 19(2) of the Interpretation Act 1978.)
- Act of Parliament
- Parliament of England
- Long title: An Acte for Thincorporacion of bothe Thunyversities. (Note: These words are printed against this act in the second column of the second schedule to the Statute Law Revision Act 1948, which is headed "Title".)
- Citation: 13 Eliz. 1. c. 29
- Territorial extent: England and Wales

Dates
- Royal assent: 29 May 1571
- Commencement: 2 April 1571 (Note: Start of session.)
Other legislation
Amended by	Universities of Oxford and Cambridge Act 1859; Statute Law Revision Act 1888; Cambridge University and Corporation Act 1894; Statute Law Revision Act 1948

Status: Amended

Text of statute as originally enacted

Revised text of statute as amended

Text of the Oxford and Cambridge Act 1571 as in force today (including any amendments) within the United Kingdom, from legislation.gov.uk.

The Oxford and Cambridge Act 1571 (13 Eliz. 1. c. 29) is an act of the Parliament of England that incorporated the universities of Oxford and Cambridge. The act is still partly in force.

So much of the act as imposed upon the mayor, aldermen, and citizens of the City of Oxford, or any of them, or any Municipal Officer of the City of Oxford, the obligation of taking any oath for the conservation of the liberties and privileges of the University of Oxford was repealed and annulled and made void by section 1 of the Universities of Oxford and Cambridge Act 1859 (22 & 23 Vict. c. 19).
