= Universities of Oxford and Cambridge Act 1859 =

Act of the Parliament of the United Kingdom

Universities of Oxford and Cambridge Act 1859 (Note: The citation of this act by this short title was authorised by section 3 of, and schedule 3 to, the Statute Law (Repeals) Act 1977. Due to the repeal of those provisions, it is now authorised by section 19(2) of the Interpretation Act 1978.)
- Act of Parliament
- Parliament of the United Kingdom
- Long title: An Act to repeal Part of an Act passed in the Thirteenth Year of Elizabeth, Chapter Twenty-nine, concerning the several Incorporations of the Universities of Oxford and Cambridge, and the Confirmation of the Charters, Liberties, and Privileges granted to either of them.
- Citation: 22 & 23 Vict. c. 19
- Territorial extent: United Kingdom

Dates
- Royal assent: 13 August 1859
- Commencement: 13 August 1859 (Note: The Acts of Parliament (Commencement) Act 1793.)
Other legislation
Amends	Oxford and Cambridge Act 1571

Status: Current legislation

Text of statute as originally enacted

Revised text of statute as amended

Text of the Universities of Oxford and Cambridge Act 1859 as in force today (including any amendments) within the United Kingdom, from legislation.gov.uk.

The Universities of Oxford and Cambridge Act 1859 (22 & 23 Vict. c. 19) is an act of the Parliament of the United Kingdom. It repealed so much of the Oxford and Cambridge Act 1571 (13 Eliz. 1. c. 29), and of all charters, etc., as imposed on the mayor, aldermen, and citizens of the City of Oxford the obligation of taking any oath for the conservation of the liberties and privileges of the University of Oxford.
