= Academic procession =

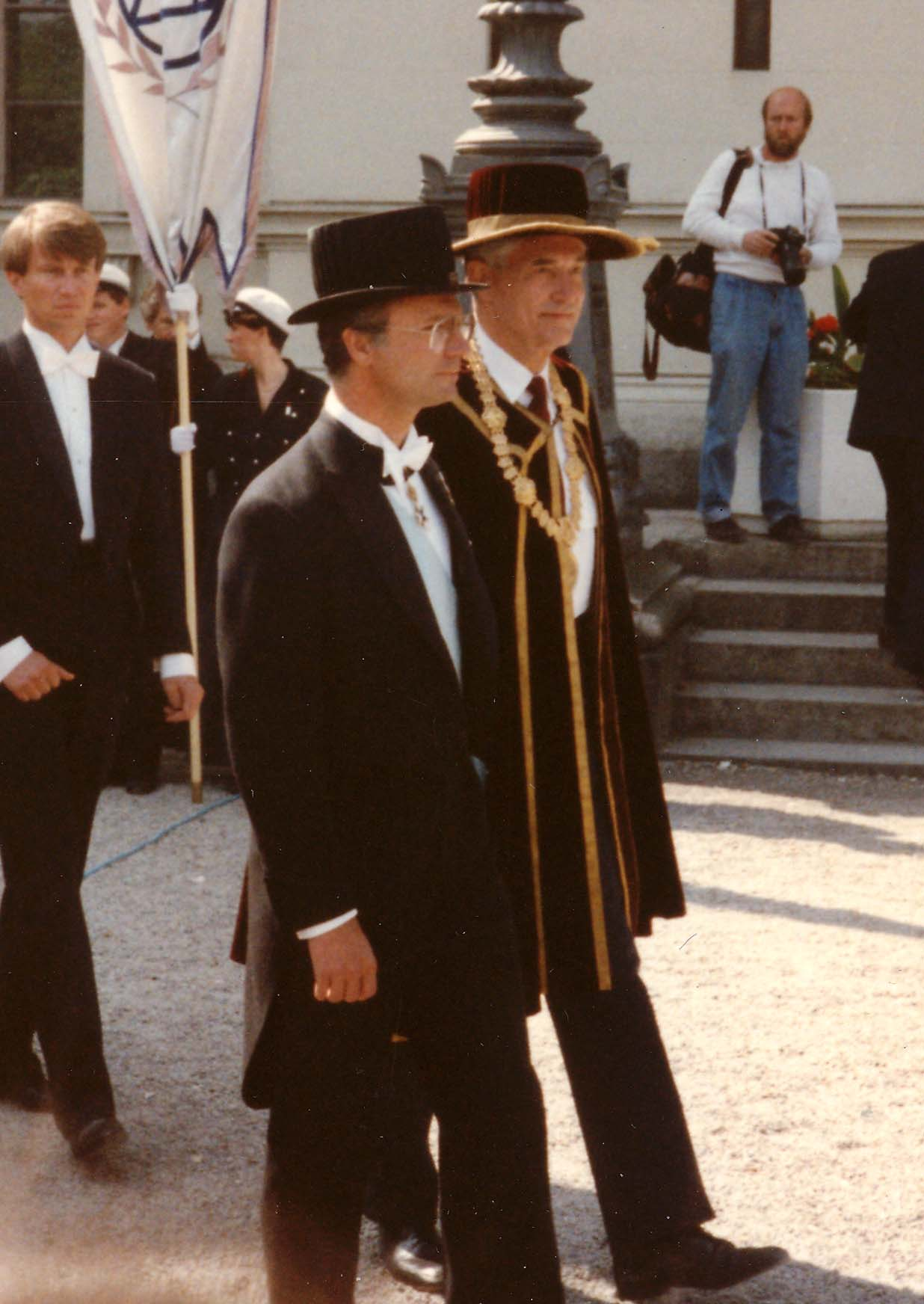
Academic procession on the occasion of the conferment of doctoral degrees at Lund University, Sweden in 1990. King Carl XVI Gustaf is wearing a doctoral hat as holder of an honorary doctorate, and to the right of him is seen rector magnificus Håkan Westling in his purple robes of office.

An academic procession is a traditional ceremony in which university dignitaries march together wearing traditional academic dress. An academic procession forms a usual part of college and university graduation exercises. At many U.S. universities, the colors and styles of regalia are determined by a uniform dress code established in 1895.

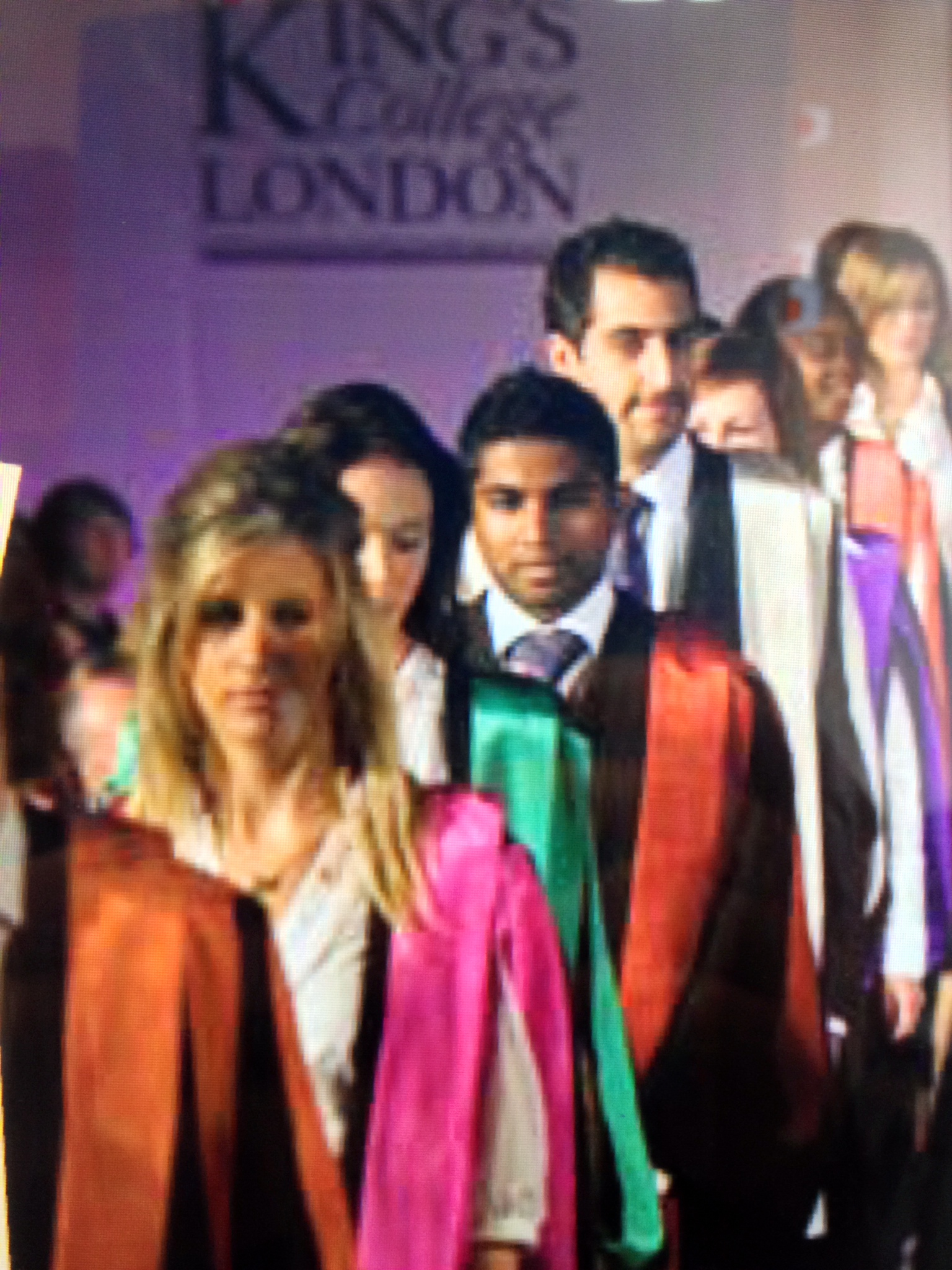
Graduation procession of King's College London, showcasing the academic dresses created by globally-renowned fashion designer Vivienne Westwood during the Summer 2008 graduation.

The installation of a university president is usually accompanied by a much more elaborate academic procession, involving visiting celebrants from other universities. In such processions, the order of appearance is governed by the institution's date of founding, oldest first. For example, when Eisenhower was installed at Columbia in 1948:

...dignitaries from the world's oldest universities—Bologna, Oxford, Paris, Cambridge, and Florence—led the procession, and representatives from over three hundred American colleges and universities followed, including Harvard's James Conant, Yale's Charles Seymour, Pennsylvania's Harold Stassen, and Princeton's Harold Dodds, and some two hundred other presidents.

The order of academic processions explains in part why universities have a tendency to use strained rationales to claim traditional dates of founding that are as early as possible. For example, the University of Pennsylvania's George E. Thomas writes of a

...debate over the founding date of the University that began in 1896 when The Alumni Register promoted the story that the University's origins lay in George Whitefield's charity school that was ostensibly founded in 1740. Because this school was to be located in the church building later acquired by the board founded by Benjamin Franklin in 1749 to house his new Academy, it could be claimed as the beginning of the University... this mergers-and-acquisitions model of institutional history had the desired effect of placing Penn ahead of Princeton in academic processions that in turn represented, in highly schematized form, the pecking order of American higher education. (The year before, in 1895, elite universities banded together to establish a national system of academic regalia that asserted an age- and class-based hierarchy and was most obviously expressed by placement in academic processions.)

== See also ==
- Academic administration
- Encaenia
