= Brunel University of London =

University in Uxbridge, London

- Coat of arms
- Type: Public
- Established: founded 1798; 228 years ago 1966; 60 years ago – gained university status by royal charter.
- Parent institution: University of London
- Affiliations: Association of Commonwealth Universities; European University Association
- Endowment: £1.57 million (2022)
- Budget: £271.3 million (2021–22)
- Vice-Chancellor: Andrew Jones
- Rector: Jocelyn Bell Burnell
- Students: 12,705 (2024/25)
- Undergraduates: 8,760 (2024/25)
- Postgraduates: 3,950 (2024/25)
- Doctoral students: 974
- Location: Kingston Lane, Uxbridge UB8 3PH, England, United Kingdom; 51°31′58″N 0°28′22″W
- Campus: Suburban
- Precursor institutions: Borough Road College (est 1798); Maria Grey Training College (est 1878); Shoreditch College of Education (1902); Acton Technical College (est 1928); Brunel College of Technology (1957); Brunel College of Advanced Technology (1962)
- Colours: Blue and gold
- Website: www.brunel.ac.uk
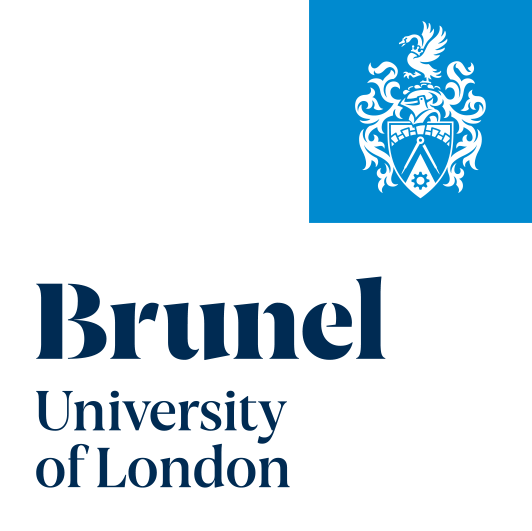

Brunel University of London (BUL) is a public research university located in the Uxbridge area of London, England. It is named after Isambard Kingdom Brunel, a Victorian engineer and pioneer of the Industrial Revolution. It became a university in June 1966, when Brunel College of Advanced Technology was awarded a royal charter and became Brunel University; it is sometimes considered a plate glass university.

In 2014 the university formally adopted the name Brunel University London, and in 2024 became the University of London's 17th member, adopting the trading name Brunel University of London. Since 2014 the university has been organised into three colleges: the College of Business, Arts and Social Sciences; the College of Engineering, Design and Physical Sciences; and the College of Health, Medicine and Life Sciences.

Brunel has more than 16,000 students and 2,200 staff, and an annual income of £271.3 million (2021–22), of which £22.4 million was from research grants and contracts, with an expenditure of £311.9 million. The university won the Queen's Anniversary Prize in 2011. BUL is a member of the Association of Commonwealth Universities, the European University Association, and Universities UK.

== History ==
=== Origins ===
Brunel University of London is one of several British universities that were founded in the 1960s in response to the Robbins Report on expanding higher education. It is sometimes described as a "plate glass university". The university's origins lie in Acton Technical College (now part of West London College), established in 1928, which split off its advanced teaching in 1956. In 1957, this new institution was named Brunel College, after the British engineer Isambard Kingdom Brunel.

In 1962, Brunel College of Technology was awarded the status of College of Advanced Technology, and it was decided that a new campus should be built for the college. Uxbridge was chosen to house the new buildings and construction began in 1965. The campus buildings, including the lecture centre, were designed in the brutalist style of architecture by Richard Sheppard, Robson & Partners, Architects.

The Uxbridge (Vine Street) railway branch line was closed in 1964, and the college purchased the land adjacent to its site where the railway had run for £65,000 from the local council.

The university's history can be traced back further to the eighteenth century through several predecessor institutions, including Borough Road College (established 1798; later the West London Institute of Higher Education), Maria Grey College (established 1878), and the Shoreditch Training College (established 1902; later the Shoreditch College of Education, housed at the former site of the Royal Indian Engineering College) which through a series of mergers became different campuses (Runnymede, Twickenham, and Isleworth) and eventually schools and departments of modern-day Brunel University based at the main campus in Uxbridge.

=== 1966 to present ===
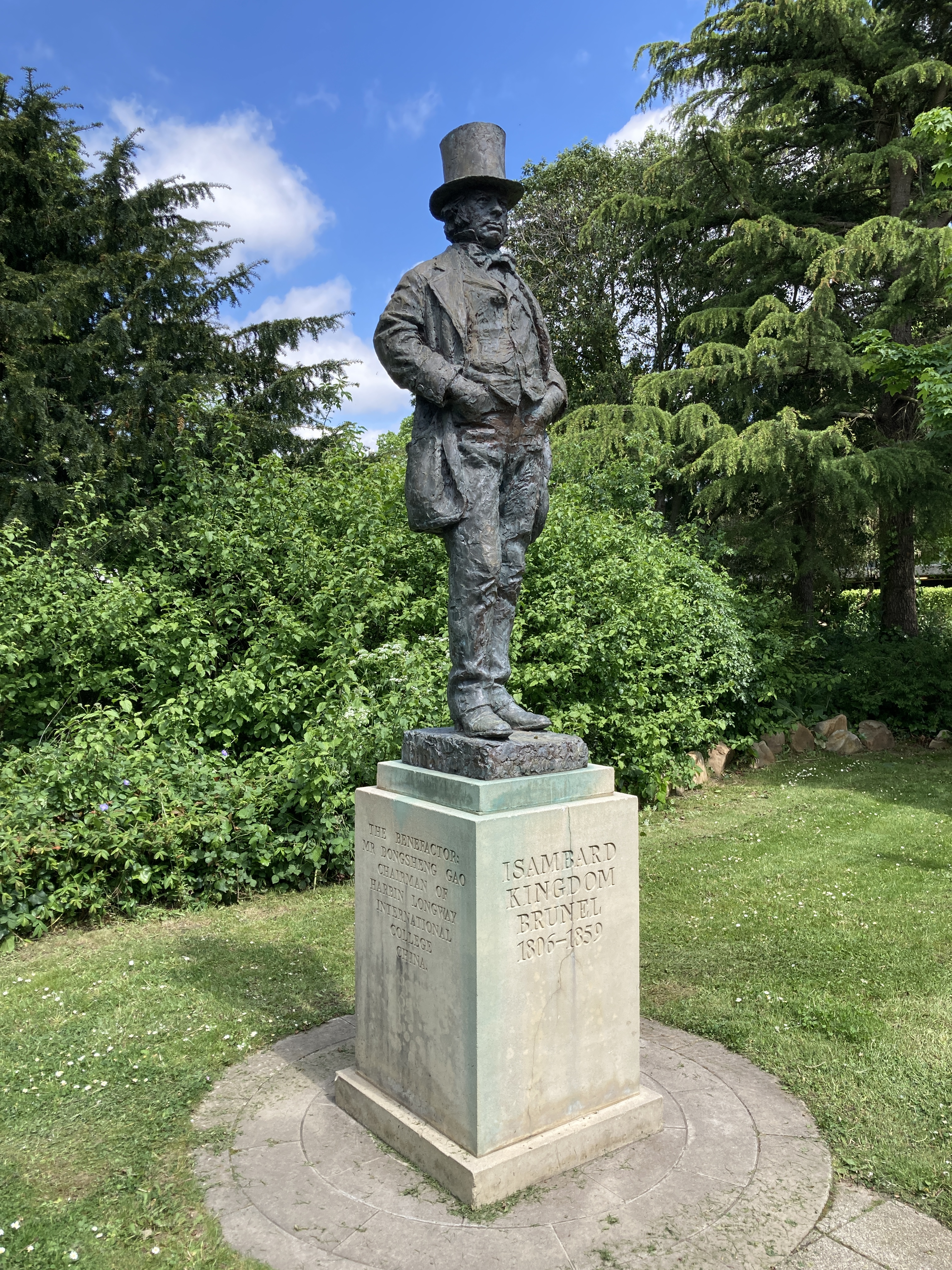
Statue of Isambard Kingdom Brunel at the university, erected in 2006

A royal charter granting university status and the power to award degrees was awarded on 9 June 1966, and the institution became Brunel University.

The university continued to use both campuses until 1971, when it left the Acton site. In 1980, the university merged with Shoreditch College of Education (Shoreditch Training College), located at Cooper's Hill, Runnymede, which became Brunel's second campus.

In 1995, the university expanded again, integrating the West London Institute of Higher Education, and adding campuses in Osterley and Twickenham, and increasing the number of courses that the university was able to offer. Traditionally the university's strengths were in engineering, science, and technology, but with the addition of the West London Institute, new departments such as arts, humanities, geography and earth science, health and sports science were added, and the size of the student body increased to more than 12,000.

Brunel has been the subject of controversy as its approach to higher education has been both market-driven and politically conservative. The decision to award an honorary degree to Margaret Thatcher in 1996, following the University of Oxford's refusal to do so, provoked an outcry by staff and students and, as a result, the ceremony had to be held in the House of Lords instead of on campus. In the late 1990s, the departments of physics, chemistry and materials engineering were all closed and in 2004 the then vice-chancellor, Steven Schwartz, initiated the reorganisation of the university's faculties and departments into schools, and closed the Department of Geography and Earth Sciences. The succeeding vice-chancellor, the sociologist Christopher Jenks, took office in 2006. He was followed by Julia Buckingham, previously at Imperial College London, who took up the position of vice-chancellor at Brunel in 2012.

In 2014, the university underwent an internal reorganisation and its name was changed to Brunel University London (BUL) by a supplemental charter dated 16 July 2014. In 2016, Brunel celebrated its 50th anniversary since being awarded its royal charter, and staged a 14-month programme of more than 40 celebratory events.

In December 2020, the university's chancellor, Sir Richard Sykes, led an independent review of the UK's Vaccine Taskforce strategy and goals, and in June 2021 he was appointed as the taskforce's new chair, leading work to find, procure and deliver vaccines and oversee preparations for vaccine booster programmes as part of UK's COVID-19 vaccination programme.

In April 2021, it was announced that Julia Buckingham would be stepping down as vice-chancellor and president after nearly 10 years in the role. She was succeeded by Andrew Jones, who took up the position in January 2022.

Brunel became part of the University of London in October 2024, and began using the name Brunel University of London (BUL) as its trading name.

== Campus ==
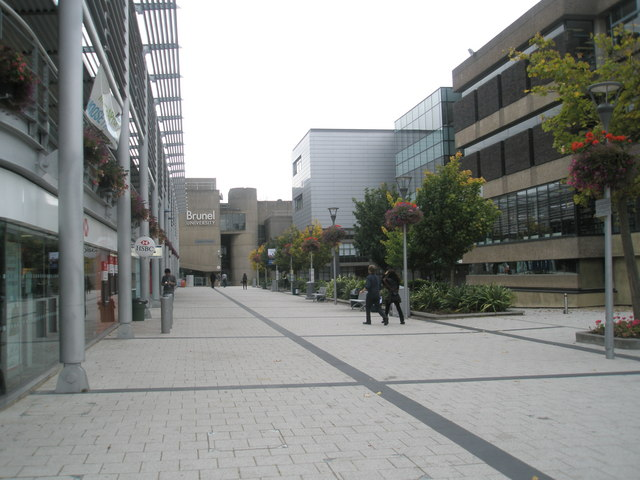
Part of the main Brunel campus

In the late 1990s Brunel devised a 10-year, £250 million masterplan for the campus. This involved selling off campus sites at Runnymede, Osterley and Twickenham and using the proceeds of the sales to renovate and update the buildings and facilities on the Uxbridge campus. Works carried out included a library extension, a state-of-the-art sports complex, renovated students' union facilities, a new Health Sciences teaching centre, and the construction of more halls of residence.

The original Uxbridge campus was designed by Sheppard, Robson and Partners, with many buildings retaining the 1960s brutalist architectural style to this day. It has appeared in several films, most famously in Stanley Kubrick's A Clockwork Orange, large parts of which were filmed on campus, particularly in the Grade II listed lecture centre and the John Crank Building (demolished July 2019). The campus has also featured in several UK television series including Spooks, Silent Witness, The Sweeney and Inspector Morse.

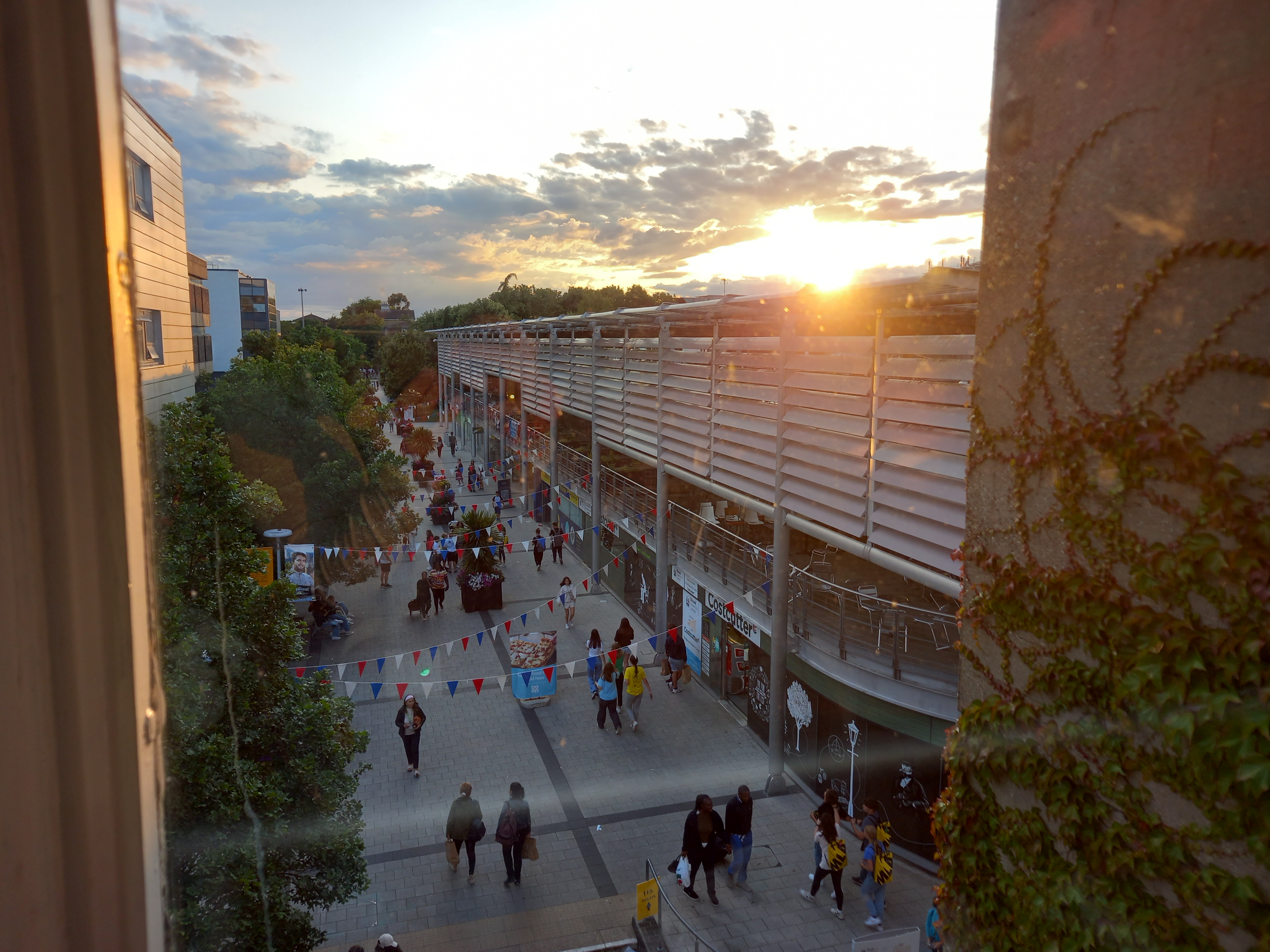
View on one of the main paths of the university.

== Organisation and governance ==
=== Colleges ===
Brunel has three constituent Academic Colleges:

College of Engineering, Design and
Physical Sciences

- Brunel Design School
- Chemical Engineering
- Civil and Environmental Engineering
- Computer Science
- Electronic and Electrical Engineering
- Mathematics
- Mechanical and Aerospace Engineering

College of Business, Arts and
Social Sciences

- Arts and Humanities
- Brunel Business School
- Brunel Law School
- Economics and Finance
- Education
- Social and Political Sciences

College of Health, Medicine and
Life Sciences

- Brunel Medical School
- Health Sciences
- Life Sciences

=== Research institutes ===
Research at Brunel has been organised into five institutes

- Institute of Communities and Society
- Institute of Digital Futures
- Institute of Energy Futures
- Institute of Health, Medicine and Environments
- Institute of Materials and Manufacturing

=== Governance ===
The university was established by a royal charter granted in 1966 and it has the status of an exempt charity as defined by the Charities Act 2011.

The governing body of BUL is the council, which comprises university staff and students and independent members. The council appoints the vice-chancellor and other senior officers. The council has established a number of committees which support its work.

The current rector of the university is Jocelyn Bell Burnell, an astrophysicist and former chancellor of the University of Dundee, who succeeded Sir Richard Sykes in 2025. The vice-chancellor since 2022 is Professor Andrew Jones, formerly deputy president at City, University of London.

Brunel's academic governing body is the senate, which is chaired by the vice-chancellor. The senate's powers, duties and functions are set out in its ordinances, and it has a number of committees which support its work.

=== Finances ===
In the financial year ended 31 July 2020, Brunel had a total income (including share of joint ventures) of £237.1 million (2018–19: £229.8 million) and total expenditure of £235.7 million (2018–19: £224.7 million).

Total income for 2019–20 was £237.1 million, £7.3 million (3.2%) higher than in 2018–19. Tuition fees overall increased by £10.1 million, reflecting the increase in the number of students enrolled, while funding body grants were flat at £30.6 million. Research grant income for 2019/ 20 was £3.1 million higher than in 2018–19 on a recognised income basis. Research income reflects the timing of work undertaken on research grants, as income is recognised in the financial statements over a period typically averaging three years. Other income reduced by £6.0 million, or 12.4%. This consists of student residences income, conference, hotel, retail and also income from summer school activity for foreign language students on the campus. All categories were significantly impacted by the pandemic, including the decision by the university not to charge rent for accommodation for the final term.

Excluding the Universities Superannuation Scheme (USS) pension revaluation, expenditure was £9.8 million (4.3%) higher than in 2018–19. Excluding pension adjustments, staff costs of £135.0 million were £15.5 million (13.0%) higher than in 2018–19. The university invested resources in its academic provision as its tuition fee income and student numbers have increased and has also targeted staff cost investment in its information technology provision and other support services. Other operating expenses of £76.9 million were £5.6 million lower than in 2018–19.

=== Coat of arms ===
Brunel University's coat of arms

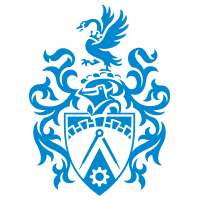
Updated coat of arms artwork as used in new logo (2024), with slightly reconfigured elements.

The Brunel coat of arms was granted to the university on 12 June 1970, and incorporates various images representative of the university's heritage and principles.

The masonry arch symbolises Isambard Kingdom Brunel, after whom the university is named; the compass and cogwheel symbolise technology, on which the university initially focused, and the institution's former status as a College of Advanced Technology; the ermine lozenge is an allusion to the arms of Lord Halsbury, the first Chancellor of the university. The full coat of arms has a swan as the crest, which symbolises Uxbridge, where the main campus is located.

The heraldic description is given as "Azure a Pair of Dividers chevronwise proper in base on a Pile reversed Or a Lozenge Ermine a Chief enarched in the form of a bridge of masonry proper AND for the Crest On a Wreath of the Colours A swan wings addorsed proper about the neck a Mural Crown Or resting the dexter foot on a Cogwheel proper."

In 2024, with Brunel joining the federation of the University of London, it adopted a new logo, which included redrawn artwork of the coat of arms with slightly reconfigured elements. Most prominently, the cogwheel was moved from under the swan's foot to a central position in the shield, replacing the ermine lozenge.

== Academic profile ==
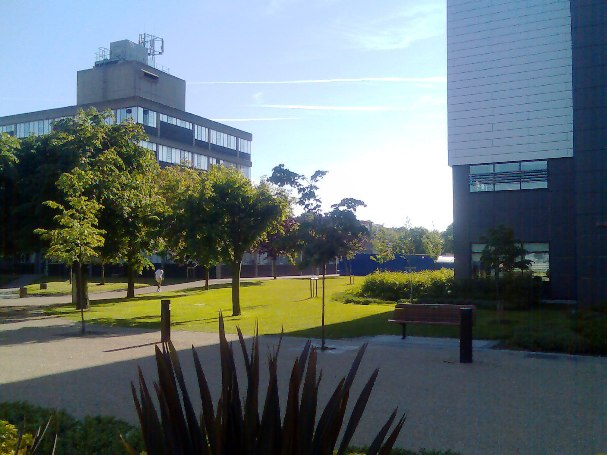
A view of the Brunel University campus in Uxbridge

Brunel students have access to specialist laboratories for electronic imaging, bioprocessing and experimental techniques; flight, driving and train simulators; a 3-D body scanner; an MRI scanner; motion-capture equipment; an occupational therapy suite; sports and performing arts facilities; and academic archives in cult film and contemporary writing.

Depending on the degree course followed, many undergraduate students may choose to undertake practical placements and projects as an integral part of their courses (a founding principle of the sandwich degree structure).

=== Research ===
In the 2008 Research Assessment Exercise (RAE), 90% of Brunel research submitted was rated as being of international quality. In the Research Excellence Framework (REF) in 2014, Brunel was ranked 33rd for Research Power.

A comparison of the data submitted to REF2021 compared to the submission for REF2014 demonstrates a 9.6% increase of staff Full-time equivalent (FTE) submitted, a 5.9% increase in Early Career Researchers, 22% increase in PhD graduation per staff (FTE) per year and a 55% increase in spend per staff (FTE) per year.

Courses at Brunel draw on staff's research in areas including Law, Cancer Genetics, Environmental Science, Human-Centred Design, Materials Processing, Contemporary Music and Digital Performance, Children's Education and Sports Medicine.

=== 'Made in Brunel' (annual design exhibition) ===
Brunel's Design School holds an annual design exhibition called Made In Brunel, to promote and showcase the work of final year students to the design industry. Rather than being hosted on campus, the exhibition has been held at a variety of venues in central London, including the Business Design Centre in Islington, and the Bargehouse at the Oxo Tower Wharf on the Southbank.

=== Reputation and rankings ===
Rankings
National rankings
- Complete (2027): 48
- Guardian (2027): 117
- Times / Sunday Times (2027): 117

Global rankings
- ARWU (2026): 701–800
- QS (2027): 353
- THE (2026): 401–500

The university won the Queen's Anniversary Prize in 2011.

BUL was ranked as one of the top 350 universities in the world by the QS World University Rankings 2025 and among the top 400 by the Times Higher Education World University Rankings 2025. In the Complete University Guide 2025 it features among the 50 best UK universities in subjects like civil engineering, computer science and law.

== Student life ==
=== Student recreational and general facilities ===
Brunel has a gym, spa, and running track with professional training and medical facilities. On campus there is also a pharmacy, a shop, one bar called Locos, a nightclub called Venue, and a café named "1966" after the year of the university's founding. Historically Brunel Student Hall and The Sports Barn were key venues for band tours in the 1970–1990s with some of the biggest names in rock music including, Fairport Convention, Fleetwood Mac, the Who, Deep Purple, Genesis, ELO, the Kinks, Thin Lizzy, Joy Division, the Pretenders, the Specials, the Stone Roses. The Sex Pistols played the first gig of their 'Never Mind the Bans Tour' at Brunel on 16 December 1977.

The Bannerman Centre at the heart of the campus contains a 4 floor library (opened in 1973 by Heinrich Böll) with c.400,000 books and 1,500 study spaces, usually open 24/7 during term-time. The Bannerman Annexe contains the Professional Development (Careers) Centre, PC labs, large teaching rooms with collaborative technology and various student service functions such as the Assistive Technology Centre.

=== Union of Brunel Students ===
The Union of Brunel Students is the students' union of Brunel University. The Union is based within the Hamilton Centre on the Uxbridge campus.

Among other services, the Union runs two venues on the Brunel campus: the Venue nightclub, Loco's bar.

The Union is led by fourteen democratically elected staff from the student body – six Student Officers, four Standing Committee Chairs and six Working Group Chairs – supported by more than thirty professional staff.

=== The Brunel Times & Hillingdon Herald ===
The Brunel Times is Brunel University's official student newspaper. Before 2019, it was called Le Nurb, which has Brunel spelt backwards. Before that, it was a magazine called Route 66, named after the different campus locations – Runneymede, Osterley, Uxbridge and Twickenham – not after a bus route that supposedly ran through Brunel's campus along Cleveland Road. The newspaper editorial team is made up of volunteer students and is funded by the Union of Brunel Students. Traditionally, the newspaper has held a left-wing bias and has published interviews with prominent political figures including Shadow Chancellor John McDonnell, a Brunel alum and MP for Hayes and Harlington.

Hillingdon Herald is a monthly newspaper, written and produced by students from Brunel University of London, with a focus on the London Borough of Hillingdon and wider London. Launched in October 2021, the first issue included columns from Prime Minister Boris Johnson, MP for Uxbridge and South Ruislip; former Shadow Chancellor John McDonnell; and David Simmonds, MP for Ruislip, Northwood and Pinner.

=== Formula Student ===
Brunel was one of the first UK universities to enter the Formula Student engineering competition, an annual event in which universities from around the world compete in static and dynamic events using formula style racing cars designed and manufactured by students. Brunel's Formula Student teams have won prizes in the annual competition every year since they first entered in 1999.

The Brunel Racing team is composed of undergraduate and postgraduate students, each being allocated an area of the car to develop. Students on MEng Mechanical Engineering courses act as team leaders and manage BEng students throughout the year to ensure a successful completion of a new car each year. Brunel Racing were UK Class 1 Formula Student Champions in 2002, and were the leading UK team at Formula ATA 2005, the Italian Formula Student event. In 2006, Formula Student Event, Brunel Racing were also the highest finishing UK competitor using E85 (fuel composed of 85% ethanol and 15% petrol.)

=== Student housing ===
Brunel's £250 million campus redevelopment programme, completed in 2008, refurbished existing halls and the built the new Isambard Complex. There are 34 self-catering halls of residence on-campus, with a total of 4,549 rooms, including studio flats for co-habiting couples. Rooms are available for undergraduates, postgraduates, students with disabilities and co habiting couples. All rooms have network access.

Many of the halls of residence around the Uxbridge campus are named after bridges that Isambard Kingdom Brunel either built or helped to design; other halls are named after him or other notable engineers or scientists. For example:

- Clifton Hall (after the Clifton Suspension Bridge)
- Saltash Hall (after the Royal Albert Bridge that crosses the River Tamar at Saltash)
- Chepstow Hall (after the bridge across the River Wye at Chepstow)
- Fleming Hall (after Sir Alexander Fleming)
- Faraday Hall (after Sir Michael Faraday)
- Galbraith Hall (after W R Galbraith, who designed the Kew Railway Bridge)
- Mill Hall (after John Stuart Mill)

There are also three accommodation complexes: the Bishop Complex (Bishop, Kilmorey, Lacy and St Margaret's Halls); the Lancaster Complex (Lancaster, Stockwell, Southwark, Borough Road, Maria Grey and Gordon Halls); and the Isambard Complex (North, Meadow, Michael Bevis, Concourse, Stephen Bragg, West, Maurice Kogan, David Neave, Central, East, Runnymede, George Shipp, Trevor Slater, Shoreditch, Syd Urry, South and Brian Winstanley Halls).

== Notable academics ==
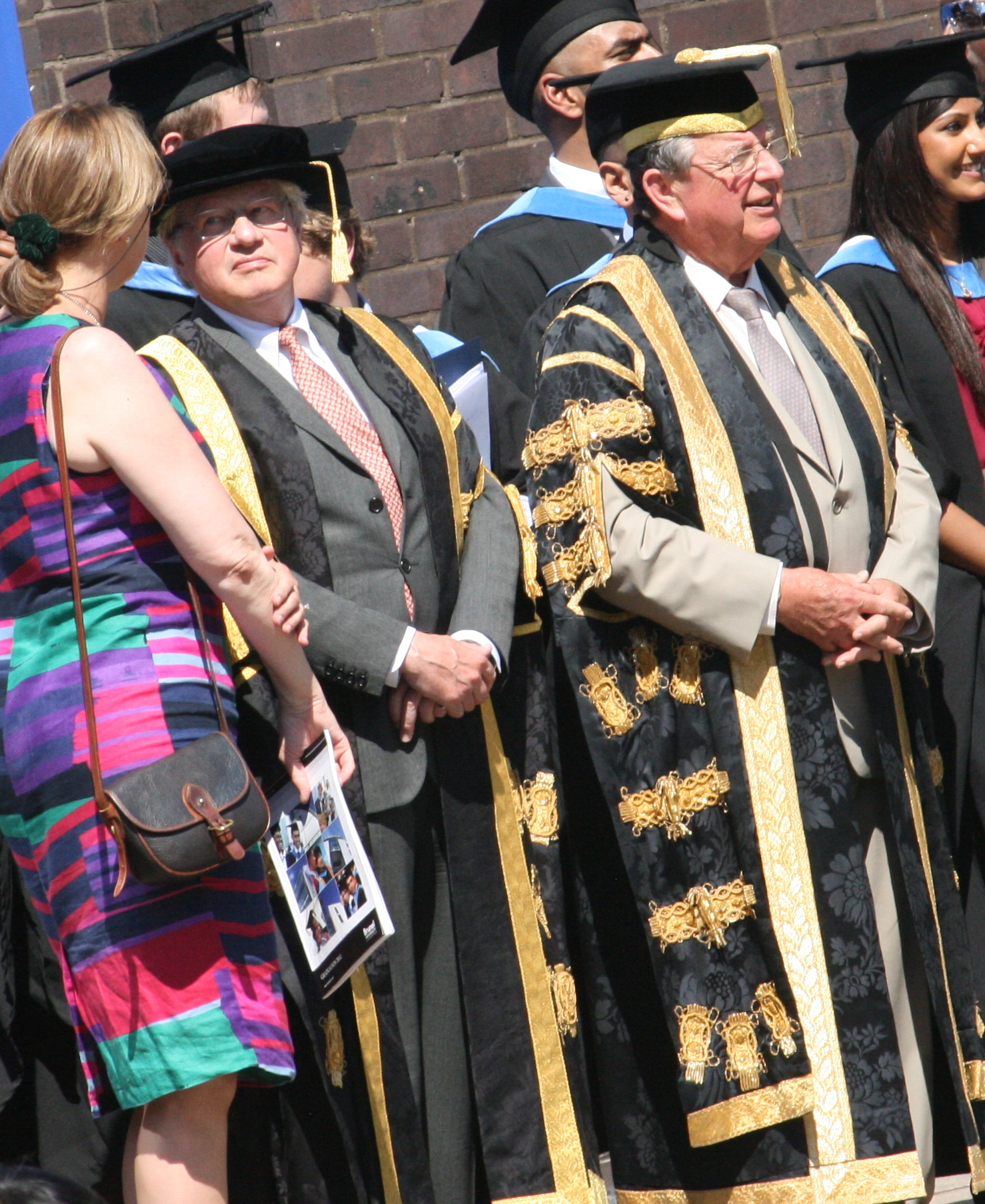
Chancellor (John Wakeham, Baron Wakeham) and Vice-Chancellor (Christopher Jenks) of Brunel in 2012

- Bernardine Evaristo: Professor of Creative Writing, joint winner of the Booker Prize 2019
- Will Self: Professor of Modern Thought
- Heinz Wolff: former emeritus professor at Brunel University London founded the Brunel Institute for Bioengineering in 1983
- Fiona Templeton: Senior Lecturer in Drama
- Benjamin Zephaniah: former professor of Creative Writing
- Hannah Lowe: Professor of Creative Writing, poet and winner of the Costa Book Award 2021
- Daljit Nagra: Professor of Creative Writing, poet and presenter of BBC Radio 4 Extra's 'Poetry Extra'
- Fay Weldon: former professor of Creative Writing
- Celia Brackenridge: former Professor and Director for Youth Sport and Athlete Welfare, and campaigner against abuse and harassment in sport
- Javaid Rehman: Professor of International Law, former UN Rapporteur on Iran
- Alexandra Xanthaki: Professor of International Law, UN Rapporteur on Cultural Rights
- Brian Cantor: Professor of Materials and BCAST Strategic Advisor, former Vice-Chancellor of the University of Bradford and the University of York
- Hussam Jouhara: Professor of Thermal Engineering
- Asoke K. Nandi: Professor of Electronic and Electrical Engineering

=== Vice-Chancellors ===
- 1966 to 1971: James Topping
- 1971 to 1981: Stephen Bragg
- 1981 to 1989: Richard Evelyn Donohue Bishop
- 1990 to 2001: Michael Sterling
- 2002 to 2006: Steven Schwartz
- 2006 to 2012: Christopher Jenks
- 2012 to 2021: Julia Buckingham
- 2021 to present: Andrew Jones

=== Chancellors and rectors ===
- 1966 to 1997: Tony Giffard, 3rd Earl of Halsbury
- 1998 to 2012: John Wakeham, Baron Wakeham
- 2013 to 2023: Sir Richard Sykes
- 2025 to present: Jocelyn Bell Burnell

== Notable alumni ==
=== Media, entertainment and the arts ===
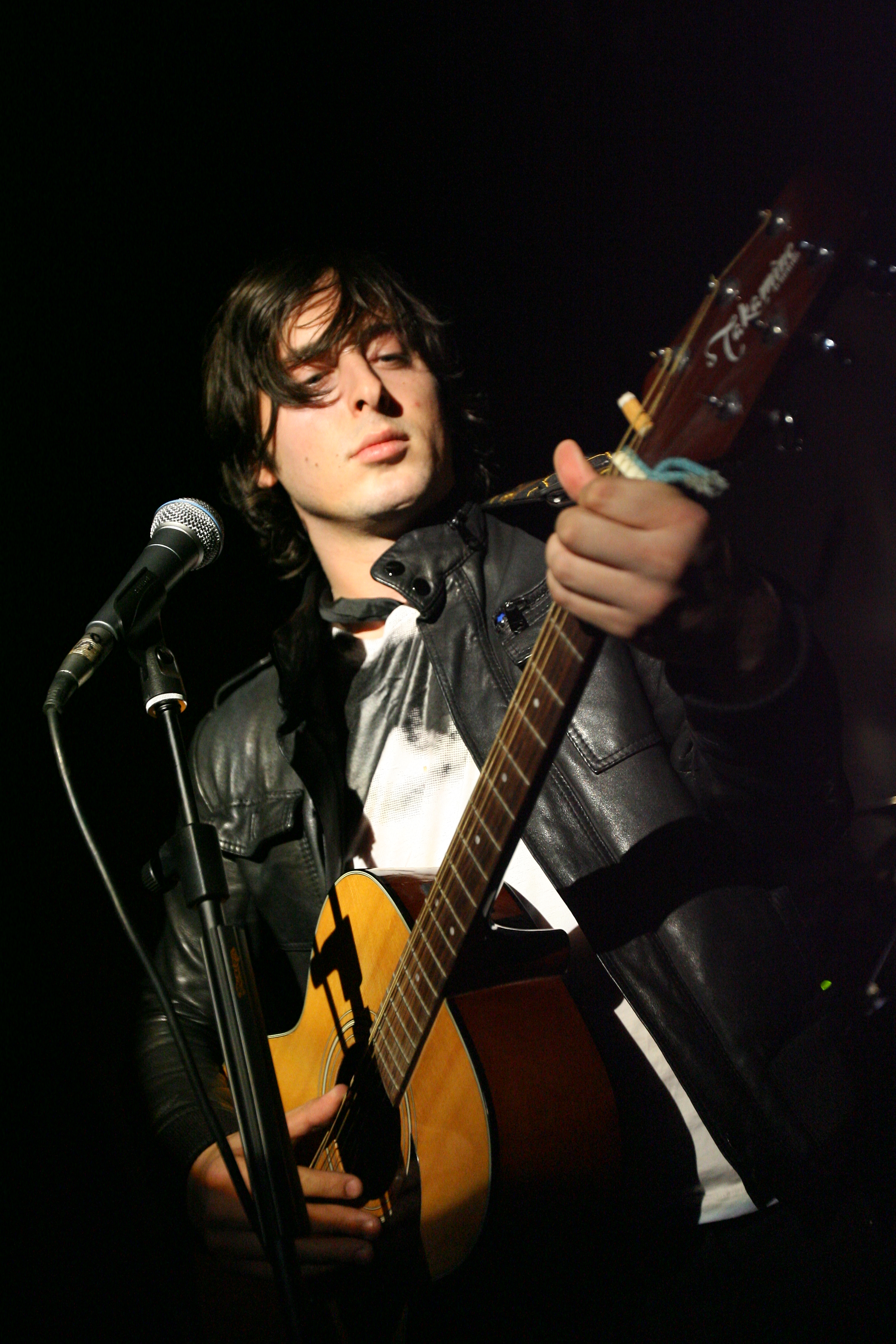
Carl Barât

- Nick Abbot (Psychology), radio presenter
- Shohreh Aghdashloo (International Relations), actress
- Rotimi Alakija, DJ, record producer and recording artist
- Hajaz Akram, actor
- Mark Bagley, comic book artist
- Carl Barât (Drama, did not graduate), musician, The Libertines and Dirty Pretty Things
- Adam Benzine, (Multimedia Technology & Design), Oscar-nominated filmmaker and journalist
- Jo Brand, (Social Sciences and Nursing), comedian
- Dave Brown, photographer, graphic designer The Mighty Boosh
- Hopewell Chin'ono, filmmaker and journalist
- Marko Ciciliani, composer and audiovisual artist
- Mike Collins, Comic book artist, Writer (Politics, Modern History and Government)
- Michael Dapaah (Drama), actor, writer and comedian
- Greg Davies, (English and Drama), actor and comedian
- Thomas Duke, ("Film"), influencer, film interviewer, and photographer
- Ray BLK, stage name for Rita Ekwere, (English), singer-songwriter
- Francis French, space historian
- Damson Idris (Actor), British actor
- Alizeh Imtiaz, (English and Film and TV Studies BA 2008), director and actor
- Tony James, (Mathematics & Computer Science 1974), musician
- Bryony Kimmings, performance artist
- John Watts, musician, Fischer-Z
- Lee Mack, comedian
- Sophie McShera (Drama), actress
- Oreke Mosheshe (Management and Law), actor, television presenter and model
- Beverly Naya, Nigerian actress, stars in Tinsel
- Ijeoma Onyeator ("Media, Communication and Technology), journalist, news anchor and media personality
- Archie Panjabi (Management Studies 1996), actor
- Nathaniel Peat (Mechanical Engineering, Advanced Manufacturing Systems), social entrepreneur, winner of the reality TV show The Last Millionaire
- Claire Phillips, (Mechanical Engineering 1986), portrait artist
- Amber Rose Revah (Contemporary Performance), actress, House of Saddam and The Punisher
- Laurence Rickard, actor, screenwriter and comedian
- Bindya Solanki (Drama), actor
- Tade Thompson, speculative fiction writer
- Lucy Verasamy (Geography), weather forecaster
- Kaan Yıldırım (Marketing), Turkish actor

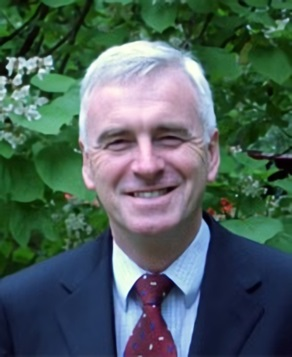
John McDonnell

=== Politics, nobility, and royalty ===
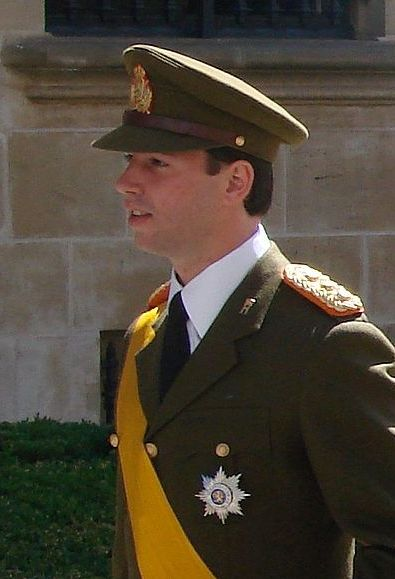
Guillaume V, Grand Duke of Luxembourg

- Rosena Allin-Khan (Medical Biochemistry), Labour Party politician, MP For Tooting
- Sayyida Meyyan bin Shihab Al Said (MA in Design Strategy and Innovation), member of the Omani royal family
- Joyce Anelay, Baroness Anelay of St Johns, politician, Minister of State of the Foreign and Commonwealth Office
- Eddy Balancy (Sociology and Law), Acting President of Mauritius
- Jenny Chapman (Psychology), Labour Party politician, MP For Darlington
- Chen Jining (Biochemistry), Communist Party Secretary of Shanghai
- James Colthurst, radiologist, son of the 10th Colthurst baronet, friend of Diana, Princess of Wales
- Sarah Dines (Law), Conservative Party politician, former MP For Derbyshire Dales
- Abdul Fattaah, member of the Brunei royal family
- Guillaume V, Grand Duke of Luxembourg, member of the Luxembourg royal family, Grand Duke of Luxembourg (2025 - Present)
- Abang Johari (MBA), current Premier of Sarawak, Malaysia
- Diana Johnson (Law), Labour Party politician, MP For Kingston upon Hull North
- John Leech (History and Politics), politician, MP for Manchester Withington
- John McDonnell, politician, former Shadow Chancellor of the Exchequer
- Ralph Miliband, political theorist
- Hamdullah Mohib, (PhD Computer Systems Engineering), Afghan politician and diplomat, Ambassador of Afghanistan to the United States
- Reza Moridi, (MTech and PhD in physics), Canadian politician
- Anastasios Papaligouras (Master's in Comparative European Law), Greek politician, former Minister of Justice
- Pekka Sauri (PhD 1990), Finnish psychologist, politician, writer and cartoonist
- Tengku Sarafudin Badlishah, Crown Prince of Kedah
- Alec Shelbrooke (Mechanical Engineering), Conservative Party politician, MP For Elmet and Rothwell
- Seng Han Thong (MBA 1993), Singaporean politician
- Gagan Sikand, Member of Parliament for Mississauga—Streetsville Constituency in Canada
- Ville Skinnari, (LLM), Finnish politician, Minister for Development Cooperation and Foreign Trade
- John Tomlinson (Health Services Management), Labour politician and life peer
- Shailesh Vara (Law), Conservative Party politician, Secretary of State for Northern Ireland, MP for North West Cambridgeshire
- Rudi Vis (PhD Economics), Labour Party politician, MP For Finchley and Golders Green
- Claire Ward (MA Britain and the European Union), Labour politician, former MP for Watford
- Marina Yannakoudakis (BSc Government, Politics and Modern History), Conservative Party politician, MEP for London

=== Science, technology and engineering ===
- Edward Karavakis (PhD 2010), computer scientist

=== Sport ===
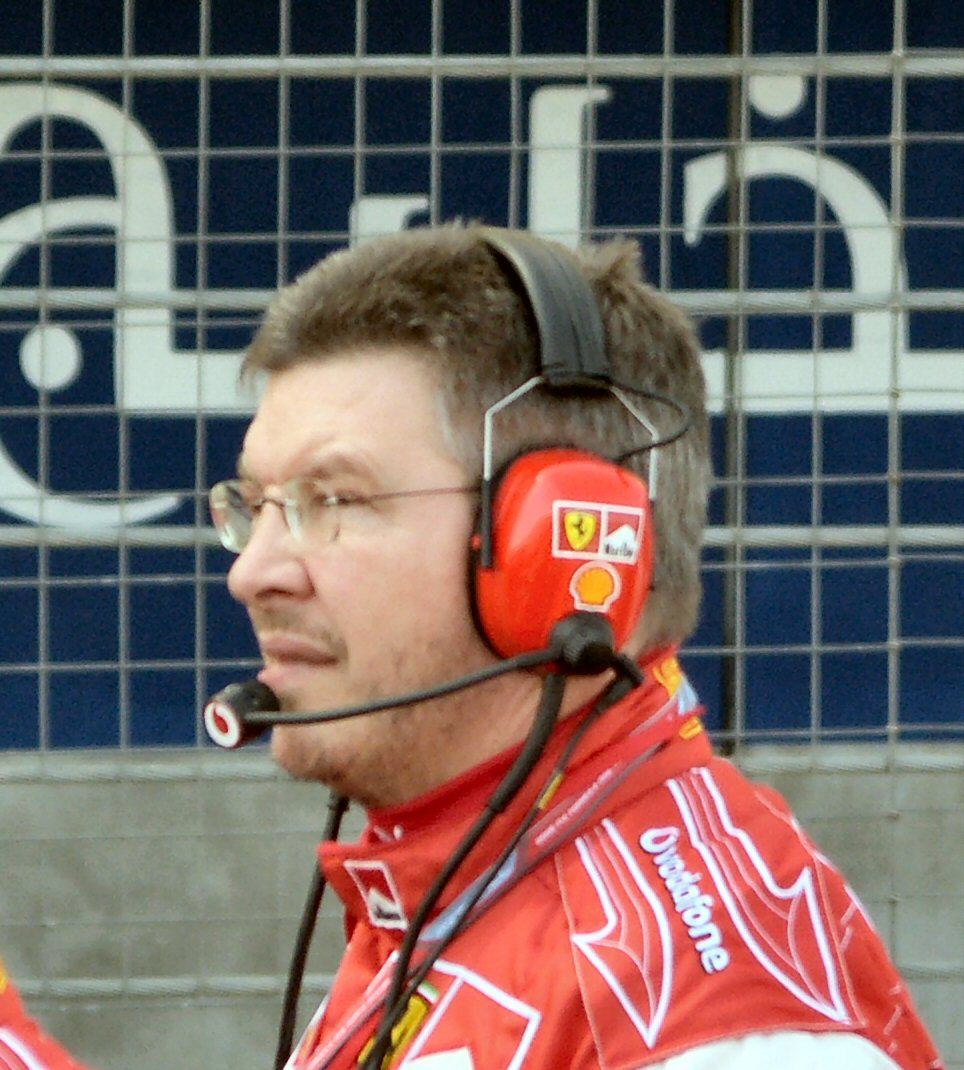
Ross Brawn

- Tony Adams (Sports Science), footballer, former Arsenal and England captain and Portsmouth F.C. manager
- Eniola Aluko (Law), England Ladies footballer
- Ross Brawn, former team principal for Mercedes Formula One team
- Mike Coughlan (Mechanical Engineering 1981), former Chief Designer for McLaren Formula One team
- James Cracknell (MSc Sport Science 1999), rower, Olympic gold medallist
- Abi Ekoku, former GB Lions rugby league manager, British discus champion and Bradford Bulls, London Broncos and Halifax winger
- Heather Fell (Physiotherapy), Olympic Modern Pentathlete and Triathlete
- Ben Gollings, rugby player, Captain of England Sevens, IRB Sevens Series all-time top scorer
- Chad Gould (Sports Science), footballer
- Elizabeth Hall (Physiotherapy), athlete
- Roger Hammond (Materials Science), cyclist
- Audley Harrison (Sport Sciences 1999), boxer, Olympic gold medallist
- Richard Hill (Geography and Sports Science), rugby player, 2003 Rugby World Cup winner
- Ali Ibrahim, Egyptian rower
- Catherine Murphy, athlete
- Beth Rodford (Sport Science), rower
- Michael Olowokandi, former NBA player, No. 1 overall pick of the 1998 NBA draft
- Abiodun Oyepitan (Politics and Sociology), athlete
- Perri Shakes-Drayton (Sport Sciences 2011), athlete
- Tom Shanklin, rugby player, Lions tourist and Wales rugby union international
- Iwan Thomas (Geography and Sports Science), athlete
- Jon Tomlinson, Head of Aerodynamics for Cadillac Formula One team

== See also ==
- Armorial of UK universities
- Centre for Sustainability and Environmental Management / Brunel Management Programme
- College of advanced technology (United Kingdom)
- List of universities in the United Kingdom
- Universities in London
