= Verdant universities =

Group of Australian universities established in the 1960s and 1970s

The verdant universities, also referred to as the gumtree universities, are a group of Australian universities founded in the 1960s and 1970s. These tertiary institutions were established in their respective state capitals, often next to native bushland (today's nature reserves), and were usually centred around lush vegetative campuses, to which the term verdant refers. The verdant universities often stand in contrast to the older and ostensibly more prestigious sandstone universities.

They are predominantly the second or third established university in their state; the only exception is Macquarie, which is the third university in Sydney, but the fourth university in New South Wales.

| University | Location | State | Established |
|---|---|---|---|
| Flinders University | Adelaide | SA | 1966 |
| Griffith University | Brisbane | QLD | 1971 |
| La Trobe University | Melbourne | VIC | 1964 |
| Macquarie University | Sydney | NSW | 1964 |
| Murdoch University | Perth | WA | 1973 |

La Trobe University takes "verdant" a step further by owning a 28-hectare wildlife sanctuary and managing the Gresswell Hill Nature Conservation Reserve north of the Melbourne campus.

The verdant universities were part of a broader effort to expand and reform tertiary education in Australia, based on similar reforms that led to the creation of the plate glass universities group in the United Kingdom. All these universities went on to form Innovative Research Universities in 2003.

== Potential verdants ==
While these five are considered the "main verdants" as they have the most in common, other universities have been labelled verdant or "gumtree". They include:

- University of Newcastle (1965)
- James Cook University (1970)
- Deakin University (1974)
- University of Wollongong (1975)

== See also ==
- Plate glass university
- Robbins Report
- Ivy League
- Russell Group
- Association of American Universities
- Red brick university
