= Brunel University lecture centre =

Grade II listed building in London

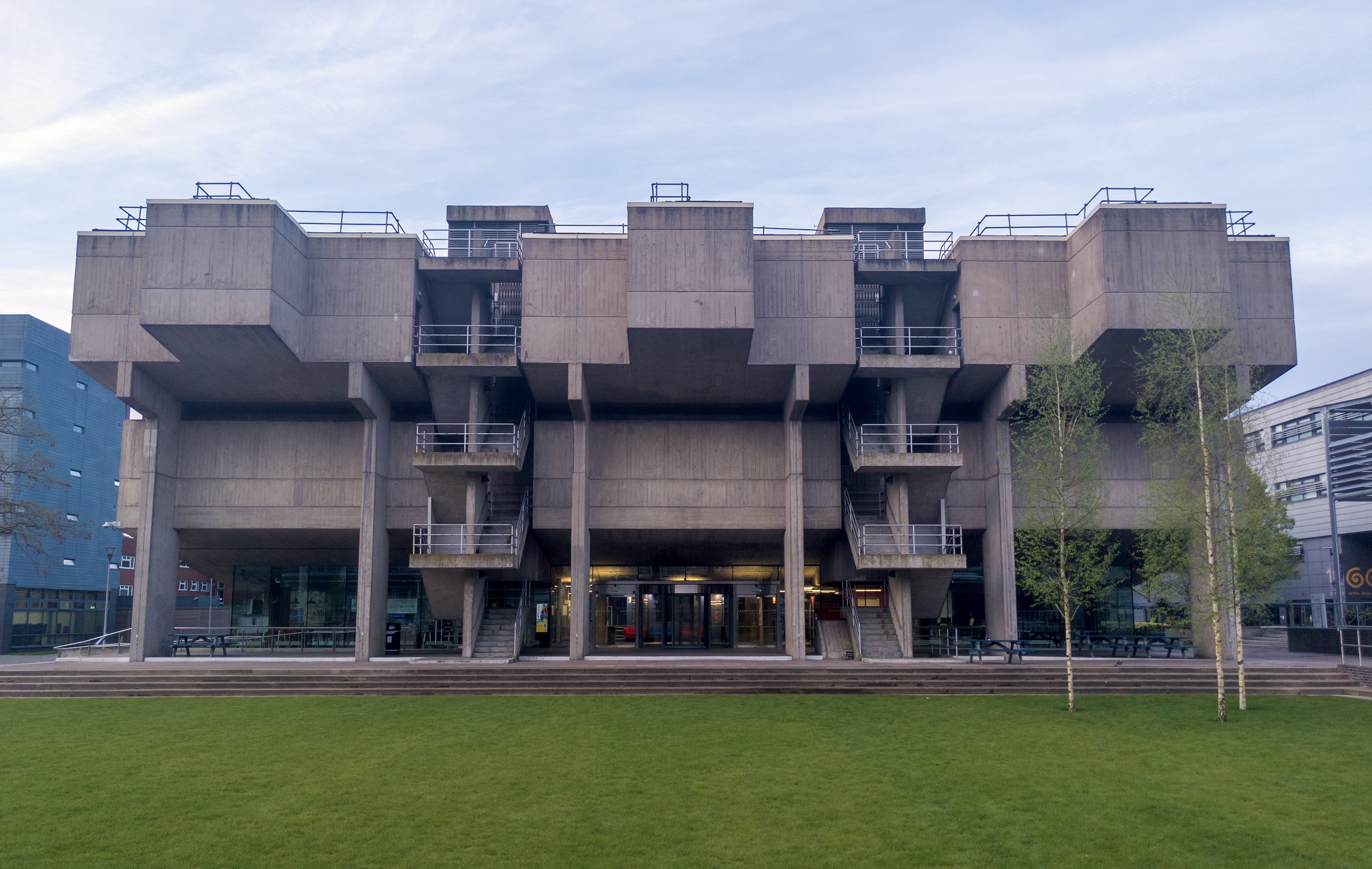
- The lecture centre, viewed from the front, in 2024.

General information
- Type: Lecture hall
- Architectural style: Brutalist
- Location: Brunel University London, Uxbridge
- Coordinates: 51°31′59″N 0°28′22″W
- Year built: 1965–1966 or 1967
- Cost: Approximately £10.2 million
- Governing body: Brunel University London

Technical details
- Material: Reinforced concrete
- Floor count: 3
- Floor area: 19,000 sq ft (1,800 m^{2})

Design and construction
- Architect: John Heywood
- Architecture firm: Sheppard Robson
- Structural engineer: Clarke Nicholls

Website
- www.brunelvenues.com/our_venues/lecture-centre/

Listed Building – Grade II
- Official name: Lecture Theatre Block, Brunel University
- Designated: 23 June 2011
- Reference no.: 1400162

The Brunel University lecture centre is a Grade II listed building on the campus of Brunel University of London, Uxbridge. It contains six large lecture halls with capacities of 160 to 200 people each, as well as smaller teaching rooms and lecture halls with capacities of 60 to 80. It was built in the mid-1960s in a brutalist style, using mostly reinforced concrete, as part of the expansion of Brunel College into Brunel University, and was designated as a Grade II listed building in 2011. It was used to depict the Ludovico Medical Facility in the 1971 Stanley Kubrick film A Clockwork Orange.

== History ==
In the post-war period, Brunel University (then Acton Technical College) shifted its focus from training teenagers and apprentices to teaching higher education, especially to ex-servicemen. It gained a positive reputation for its engineering and science courses, and by the end of 1960 the college (now called Brunel College) was aiming to become a college of advanced technology (CAT), which it achieved in January 1962.

After the upgrade of Brunel College to a CAT, the Robbins Report proposed upgrading the college to full university status, with a new campus planned to be one of the largest engineering teaching campuses in Europe. The first phase of the new campus included a lecture centre with all lecture halls placed in one building, inspired by a building at the University of Manchester which members of the Brunel Planning Group visited in 1962.

The lecture centre was finished in 1966 or 1967, and was a flagship in the group of "Robbins universities" – universities which were being upgraded as part of the Robbins Report.

On 23 June 2011, the lecture centre was designated as a Grade II listed building by Historic England. The reasons included its "distinctive, expressive manner" of construction, the high quality of materials used, and its place in the historic importance of Brunel University as a fast-growing technical college post-WWII.

== Description ==
The lecture centre is a brutalist building made with reinforced concrete. It contains six large lecture halls with capacities of 160 to 200 people each, as well as smaller teaching rooms and lecture halls with capacities of 60 to 80 people, which are located in long corridors across three floors. The box-shaped lecture halls extrude from the building, resting on large columns and beams and separated by emergency exits.

The building has been described as "imposing" and "a brutalist classic", with the expansion of the building as it rises creating "a frightening and effortlessly balanced form". In the official Historic England list entry, the extruding lecture halls were called "strongly expressed" and the north face of the building described as "an expressive centrepiece to the campus."

== In popular culture ==
The lecture centre was used to depict the Ludovico Medical Facility in the 1971 film A Clockwork Orange. It has also been used for filming projects such as Silent Witness and Inspector Morse.
