= Christopher Jenks =

British sociologist (born 1947)

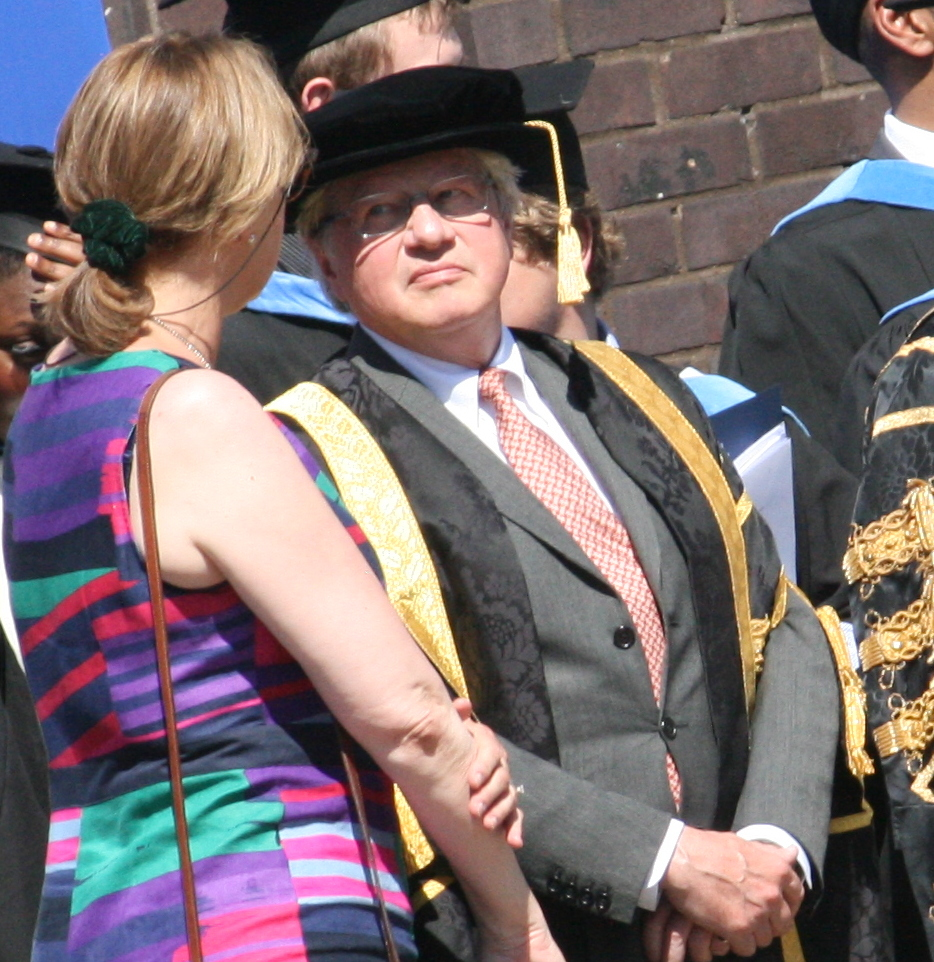
Jenks in 2012

Christopher Jenks (born 12 June 1947) is a British sociologist who was Vice-Chancellor of Brunel University from 2006 to 2012.

He was educated at Westminster City School, the University of Surrey (BSc, 1969) and the University of London (PGCE, 1970; MSc, 1971). From 1971 to 1994, he taught at Goldsmiths College, University of London, rising to become Reader in Sociology. In 1995, he joined Brunel as Professor of Sociology and Pro-Warden. He was then pro-vice-chancellor from 2004 to 2006, before being appointed Vice-Chancellor of Brunel University in 2006. He retired in 2012 and was made emeritus professor.

Academic offices
Preceded by Steven Schwartz	Vice-Chancellor of Brunel University; 2006–2012	Succeeded by Julia Buckingham
