= Plate glass university =

Group of 1960s universities in England

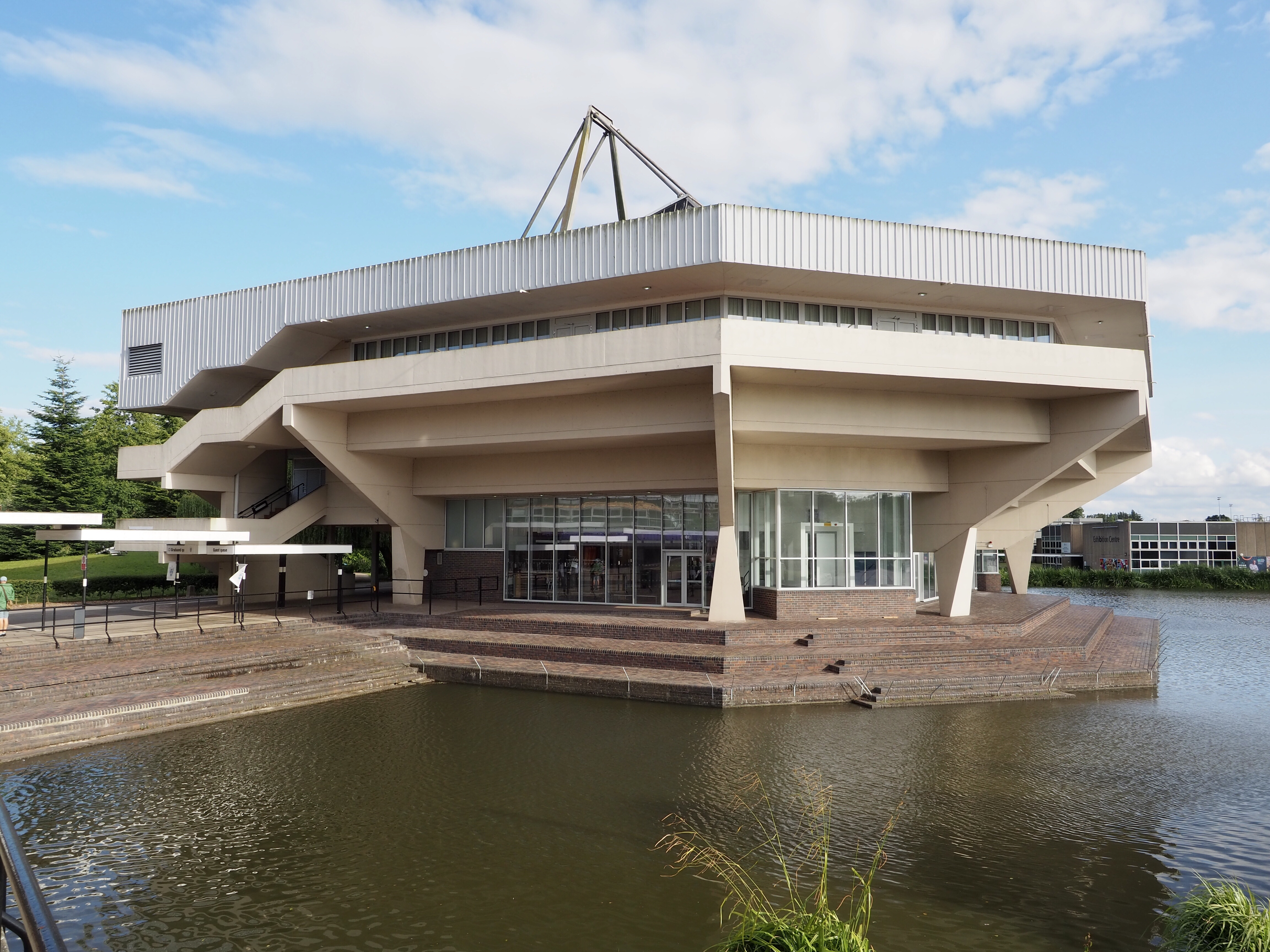
The University of York's Central Hall

A plate glass university (or plateglass university) is one of a group of universities in the United Kingdom established or promoted to university status in the 1960s. The original plate glass universities were established following decisions by the University Grants Committee (UGC) in the late 1950s and early 1960s, prior to the Robbins Report in 1963. However, the term has since expanded to encompass the institutions that became universities as a result of Robbins' recommendations.

== Origin of terminology ==
The term plateglass was coined by Michael Beloff for a book he wrote about these universities, to reflect their modern architectural design which often contains wide expanses of plate glass in steel or concrete frames. This contrasted with the (largely Victorian) redbrick universities and the very much older ancient universities.

I had at the start to decide upon a generic term for the new universities – they will not be new for ever. None of the various caps so far tried have fitted. "Greenfields" describes only a transient phase. "Whitebrick", "Whitestone", and "Pinktile" hardly conjure up the grey or biscuit concrete massiveness of most of their buildings, and certainly not the black towers of Essex. "Newbridge" is fine as far as the novelty goes, but where on earth are the bridges? Sir Edward Boyle more felicitously suggested "Shakespeare". But I have chosen to call them the Plateglass Universities. It is architecturally evocative; but more important, it is metaphorically accurate.

Beloff applied the term specifically to the new creations of the 1960s, not including the institutions promoted from university colleges or colleges of advanced technology, or created by division of existing universities "as Durham shed Newcastle". All of the original plateglass universities were created de novo as universities.

== Beloff's plateglass universities ==
Beloff listed seven universities in his book. These were the seven universities approved by the UGC prior to the Robbins Report.

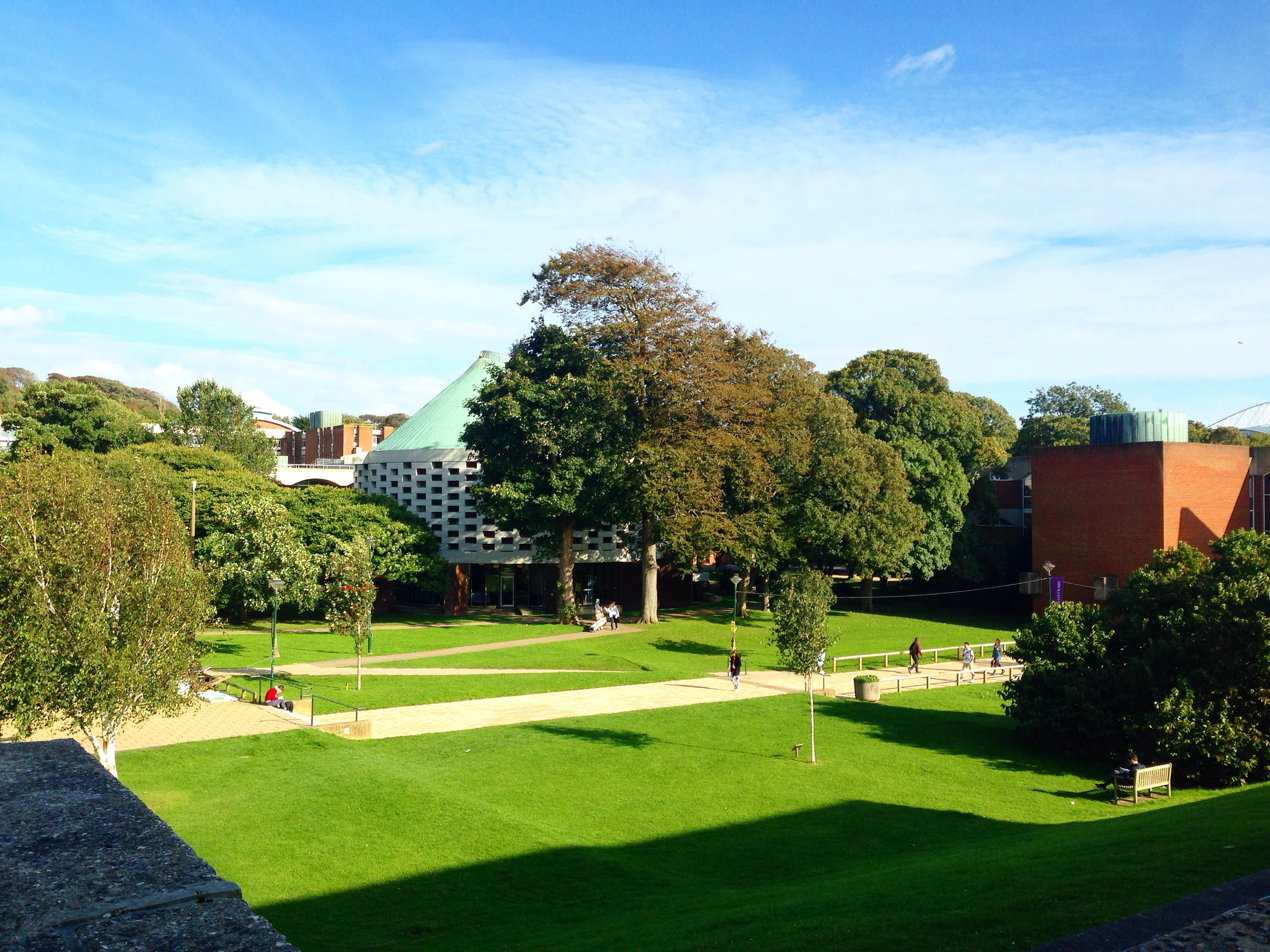
The University of Sussex, the first of the plateglass generation

- University of East Anglia (1963)
- University of Essex (1964/5)
- University of Kent at Canterbury (now known as the University of Kent) (1965)
- University of Lancaster (now known as Lancaster University) (1964)
- University of Sussex (1961)
- University of Warwick (1965)
- University of York (1963)

=== Naming ===
Unlike earlier universities in the United Kingdom, which were typically named after the city in which they were located (e.g., the University of Cambridge in Cambridge), several newer universities were named after the counties or wider regions they served. For example, universities founded in Colchester and Brighton were named after the counties of Essex and Sussex, respectively. The university in Canterbury initially adopted the name University of Kent at Canterbury, combining the county name (Kent) with the city name, although this was later simplified to the University of Kent. The university on the outskirts of Coventry, Warwickshire was named after the county town of Warwick. (Note: In the case of Warwick the naming was related to the acquisition of adjacent land outside the border of Coventry) The university in Norwich, which is in the county of Norfolk, was instead named for the wider area of East Anglia which also includes Suffolk. The universities in Lancashire and Yorkshire were located in the county towns of Lancaster and York respectively. There were already universities within those counties (Manchester and Liverpool in Lancashire; Sheffield, Leeds and Hull in Yorkshire).

Since the passage of the Further and Higher Education Act 1992 several new universities and university colleges have been created within the same city as a plate-glass university and have been named after the city, sometimes with additional distinguishing elements: Brighton, Canterbury Christ Church, Coventry, Norwich University of the Arts and York St John.

=== Common references ===
Certain aspects of the design of these universities acknowledges the formation of the group; for example, at Sussex the first batches of student residences to be built were named after some of the other new universities, i.e. "Essex House", "Kent House", "Lancaster House", "Norwich House" (for UEA), and "York House".

== Other universities, sometimes referred to as plate glass universities ==
Research at the Department for Education in 2016 categorised universities into four age groups: ancient (pre-1800), red brick (1800–1960), plate glass (1960–1992), and post-1992.

The institutions that gained university status in the 1960–1992 plate glass period are listed below. Almost all of these were promoted to university status, rather than created as universities like the institutions in Beloff's original list; ten were previously colleges of advanced technology (CATs).

(Dates refer to the granting of university status, not to founding of the institution.)

- Aston University (1966) – formerly Birmingham CAT
- University of Bath (1966) – formerly Bristol College of Science and Technology
- University of Bradford (1966) – formerly Bradford Institute of Technology
- Brunel University (1966) – formerly Brunel CAT; became a member institution of the University of London in 2024 and now operates as "Brunel University of London"
- University of Buckingham (1983) – formerly University College at Buckingham (from 1973)
- City University, London (1966) – formerly Northampton CAT; became a college of the University of London and renamed "City, University of London" in 2016
- Heriot-Watt University (1966) – formerly School of Arts of Edinburgh
- Keele University (1962) – formerly North Staffordshire University College
- Loughborough University (1966) – formerly Loughborough CAT
- Newcastle University (1963) – formerly King's College, University of Durham
- Open University (1969) – de novo creation as a distance-learning university
- University of Salford (1967) – formerly Salford CAT
- University of Dundee (1969) – formerly Queen's College Dundee, part of the University of St Andrews
- University of Stirling (1967) – de novo creation as a university
- University of Strathclyde (1964) – formerly the Royal College of Science and Technology
- University of Surrey (1966) – formerly Battersea CAT
- New University of Ulster (1968) – de novo creation as a university; merged with the older Magee University College in 1969; merged with Ulster Polytechnic and renamed "University of Ulster" in 1984

The DfE study classified higher education institutions (HEIs) according to "the length of time an HEI had been established", without a detailed definition of how this was determined. Keele might thus be considered "Red Brick" under this classification as it entered the university sector (as a university college) prior to 1960, as might Newcastle and Dundee, which were colleges of the universities of Durham and St Andrews respectively. The definition might also include institutions and colleges of the University of London that became part of the university sector in that period but did not receive university status:

- Cranfield Institute of Technology (1969) – formerly the College of Aeronautics; granted university status and renamed "Cranfield University" in 1993
- London Business School (1965) – established 1964, joined University of London 1965
- Royal College of Art (1967)

The Scottish universities from the 1960s (Heriot-Watt, Stirling, Strathclyde, Dundee and the Open University in Scotland) are also known as "chartered universities" as they were established, and are governed, by their royal charters.

== Popular culture ==
Malcolm Bradbury's 1975 campus novel The History Man is set in the fictional plate glass University of Watermouth. External scenes of the 1981 television adaptation were filmed at Lancaster University.

== See also ==
- Ancient universities
- Ancient universities of Scotland
- Armorial of UK universities
- Brutalist architecture on university campuses
- List of universities in the UK
- Post-1992 university
- Red brick university
- Verdant universities
