= SFHEA =

SFHEA may refer to:

- Scottish Further and Higher Education Association, a Scottish trade union for lecturers in further and higher education
- Senior Fellow of the Higher Education Academy, a grade in a UK professional recognition scheme for university teachers
