= College of advanced technology =

College of advanced technology may refer to:

- One of the colleges of advanced technology in the United Kingdom.
- Technical University of Denmark, named Den Polytekniske Læreanstalt (College of Advanced Technology) until 1933.
