= Post-1992 university =

Used informally to refer to several different waves of new UK universities

In the United Kingdom, a post-1992 university, synonymous with new university or modern university, is a former polytechnic or central institution that was given university status through the Further and Higher Education Act 1992, or an institution that has been granted university status since 1992 without receiving a royal charter. This is used in contrast to "pre-1992" universities.

The term "new universities" was historically used to refer to universities that were at the time new. In the mid-19th century, it was used in England to distinguish the recently established universities of Durham and London from the "old universities" of Oxford and Cambridge. In the early 20th century, the term was applied to the civic universities that had recently gained university status, such as Bristol and others (now known as red brick universities). The term was later used to refer to universities gaining their status in the 1960s, such as the former colleges of advanced technology, which were converted to universities following the 1963 Robbins Report on higher education, and the plate glass universities, which were already in the process of being established at the time of the report.

== Formation ==
Following the 1992 Act, 33 polytechnics in England, the Derbyshire College of Higher Education, the Polytechnic of Wales and three Scottish central institutions were the first to be granted university status, alongside another trio of central institutions in the years following. Many of these Polytechnics had roots in the middle 19th Century. All the categories of university award their own academic degrees, but universities created in England and Wales since 2004 may only have the power to award taught degrees, because the power to award research degrees has been removed from the criteria for university title. The Cheltenham & Gloucester College of Higher Education, which became the University of Gloucestershire in 2001, was the only institute to become a university in England between the polytechnics in 1992 and the relaxation of the criteria in 2004. Two new universities have subsequently been established in Scotland, where the old criteria still apply: Queen Margaret University (2007), another former central institution, and the University of the Highlands and Islands (2011).

== Post-1992 universities with polytechnic roots ==
- Anglia Ruskin University – formerly Anglia Higher Education College, Anglia Polytechnic then Anglia Polytechnic University.
- Birmingham City University – formerly the University of Central England in Birmingham and before that, Birmingham Polytechnic.
- Bournemouth University – formerly Bournemouth Municipal College, Bournemouth College of Technology, Dorset Institute of Higher Education then Bournemouth Polytechnic.
- University of Brighton – formerly Brighton Polytechnic.
- University of Lancashire – formerly Lancashire Polytechnic, then the University of Central Lancashire.
- Coventry University – formerly Lanchester Polytechnic then Coventry Polytechnic.
- De Montfort University – formerly Leicester School of Art and later City of Leicester Polytechnic.
- University of East London – formerly the West Ham College of Technology, before being the North East London Polytechnic, and then finally the Polytechnic of East London.
- University of Greenwich – formerly Woolwich Polytechnic, then Thames Polytechnic.
- University of Hertfordshire – formerly Hatfield Technical College then Hatfield Polytechnic.
- University of Huddersfield – formerly Huddersfield Polytechnic.
- Kingston University – formerly the Kingston Technical Institute then Kingston Polytechnic.
- Leeds Beckett University – formerly Leeds Polytechnic, then Leeds Metropolitan University.
- University of Lincoln – formerly Humberside Polytechnic then the University of Humberside and the University of Lincolnshire and Humberside.
- Liverpool John Moores University – formerly Liverpool Polytechnic.
- London Metropolitan University – merger of London Guildhall University, formerly the City of London Polytechnic, and University of North London, formerly the Polytechnic of North London.
- London South Bank University – formerly South Bank Polytechnic.
- Manchester Metropolitan University – formerly Manchester Polytechnic.
- Middlesex University – formerly Middlesex Polytechnic.
- Northumbria University – formerly Newcastle Polytechnic, formed from the merger of Rutherford College of Technology, the College of Art & Industrial Design and the Municipal College of Commerce.
- Nottingham Trent University – formerly Trent Polytechnic then Nottingham Polytechnic.
- Oxford Brookes University – formerly Oxford School of Art then Oxford Polytechnic.
- University of Plymouth – formerly Polytechnic South West, formed from Plymouth Polytechnic, Exeter College of Art and Design, Rolle College, Seale-Hayne College and Plymouth School of Maritime Studies.
- University of Portsmouth – formerly Portsmouth Polytechnic.
- Sheffield Hallam University – formerly Sheffield Polytechnic then Sheffield City Polytechnic.
- University of South Wales – formed in April 2013 from the merger of the University of Glamorgan, formerly Glamorgan Polytechnic then the Polytechnic of Wales, and the University of Wales, Newport, formerly Gwent College of Higher Education then University of Wales College, Newport.
- University of Staffordshire – formerly Staffordshire Polytechnic (originally North Staffordshire Polytechnic) and previously the separate Staffordshire College of Technology, the Stoke-on-Trent College of Art and the North Staffordshire College of Technology.
- University of Sunderland – formerly Sunderland Technical College then Sunderland Polytechnic.
- Teesside University – formerly Teesside Polytechnic.
- University of the West of England – formerly Bristol Polytechnic.
- University of West London – formerly Thames Valley University, previously the Polytechnic of West London.
- University of Westminster – formerly the Polytechnic of Central London, founded as the Royal Polytechnic Institution at Regent Street (1838).
- University of Wolverhampton – formerly The Polytechnic, Wolverhampton then Wolverhampton Polytechnic

== Post-1992 universities with central institution roots ==
- University of Abertay Dundee – formerly Dundee Institute of Technology
- Edinburgh Napier University – formerly Napier Technical College, Napier College of Commerce and Technology then Napier Polytechnic
- Glasgow Caledonian University – formed from the merger of Glasgow Polytechnic and The Queen's College, Glasgow
- The Robert Gordon University – based in Aberdeen, formerly Robert Gordon's Technical College then The Robert Gordon Institute of Technology
- University of the West of Scotland – formerly the University of Paisley (itself formerly Paisley College of Technology)

== Post-1992 universities that are not former polytechnics or central institutions ==
- Arden University - formerly RDI
- University of the Arts London – formerly London Institute
- The Arts University Bournemouth – formerly The Arts University College at Bournemouth and before that The Arts Institute at Bournemouth
- Bath Spa University – formerly Bath Spa University College and before that Bath College of Higher Education
- University of Bedfordshire – formerly University of Luton, created by the merger of the University of Luton and De Montfort University's Bedford campus
- University College Birmingham - kept its name on gaining university status
- Bishop Grosseteste University – formerly Bishop Grosseteste College, and Bishop Grosseteste University College
- University of Greater Manchester – formerly Bolton Institute of Higher Education then the University of Bolton
- BPP University – formerly BPP University College, and before that BPP College, and earlier BPP Law School
- Buckinghamshire New University – formerly Buckinghamshire Chilterns University College, and before that Buckinghamshire College of Higher Education, and earlier the High Wycombe College of Art and Technology
- Canterbury Christ Church University – formerly Christ Church College
- Cardiff Metropolitan University – formerly University of Wales Institute, Cardiff (UWIC), and before that Cardiff Institute of Higher Education, and earlier the South Glamorgan Institute of Higher Education
- University of Chester – formerly Chester College of Higher Education
- University of Chichester – formerly West Sussex Institute of Higher Education, then Chichester Institute of Higher Education, then University College Chichester
- University for the Creative Arts – formerly Kent Institute of Art & Design and Surrey Institute of Art & Design, University College
- University of Cumbria – formed in January 2007 from the merger of St Martin's College, the Cumbria Institute of the Arts (CIA) and the Cumbrian campuses of the University of Central Lancashire
- University of Derby – formerly the Derbyshire College of Higher Education
- Edge Hill University – formerly Edge Hill College
- Falmouth University – formerly Falmouth College of Arts
- University of Gloucestershire – formerly Cheltenham & Gloucester College of Higher Education
- Harper Adams University – formerly Harper Adams University College
- University of the Highlands and Islands
- University of Law - formerly the College of Law
- Leeds Trinity University – formerly Trinity and All Saints College, when merged with Trinity College and All Saints College
- Liverpool Hope University – formerly a fully accredited institution of the University of Liverpool, then Liverpool Hope University College
- Newman University – formerly Newman College of Higher Education, then Newman University College
- University of Northampton – formerly Northampton Technical College, Nene College then University College Northampton
- Norwich University of the Arts – formerly Norwich University College of the Arts
- Queen Margaret University – formerly Queen Margaret College then Queen Margaret University College
- University of Roehampton – formerly Roehampton Institute, then University of Surrey Roehampton (as part of the federal University of Surrey)
- Regent's University London - formerly Regent's College
- Royal Agricultural University – formerly the Royal Agricultural College
- Solent University – formerly Southampton Institute of Higher Education
- University of St Mark & St John - formerly University College Plymouth St Mark & St John
- St Mary's University, Twickenham – formerly St Mary's University College, Twickenham
- University of Suffolk - formerly University Campus Suffolk
- University of Winchester – formerly Winchester Diocesan Training School, renamed King Alfred's College then University College Winchester
- University of Worcester – formerly part of the University of Birmingham Department of Education then Worcester College of Higher Education
- Wrexham Glyndŵr University – formerly the North East Wales Institute of Higher Education
- York St John University – formerly the College of Ripon and York St John then York St John College

== Mergers of post-1992 and pre-1992 universities ==
These may not meet a strict definition of new universities as being universities under the 1992 act, but have elements of common heritage with new universities.

- University of Wales Trinity Saint David – formed by the merger of University of Wales, Lampeter, Trinity University College, Carmarthen and Swansea Metropolitan University (formerly West Glamorgan Institute of Higher Education). University by royal charter rather than under the 1992 act.
- Ulster University - formed in 1984 by the merger of the New University of Ulster and Ulster Polytechnic. University by royal charter.

== Secondary issues ==
Most former polytechnics welcomed the new nomenclature of "university" as evidence of the abolition of the hierarchical binary system of universities and polytechnics. The new title also assisted recruitment of foreign students (a lucrative market sector which was not always sure what a "polytechnic" was).

Most polytechnics developed from locally funded technical colleges and were controlled by and answerable to local government until they became independent higher education corporations under the Education Reform Act 1988. This severed the link with the local community and made them accountable only to the central government. However, as a result of their local roots, most employees of those polytechnic post-1992 universities are members of the Teachers' Pension Scheme, rather than the Universities Superannuation Scheme.

== See also ==
- Ancient universities
- Ancient universities of Scotland
- Plate glass university
- Red brick university
- Armorial of UK universities
- List of universities in the UK
