= List of universities in Scotland =

Scottish institutions of higher education

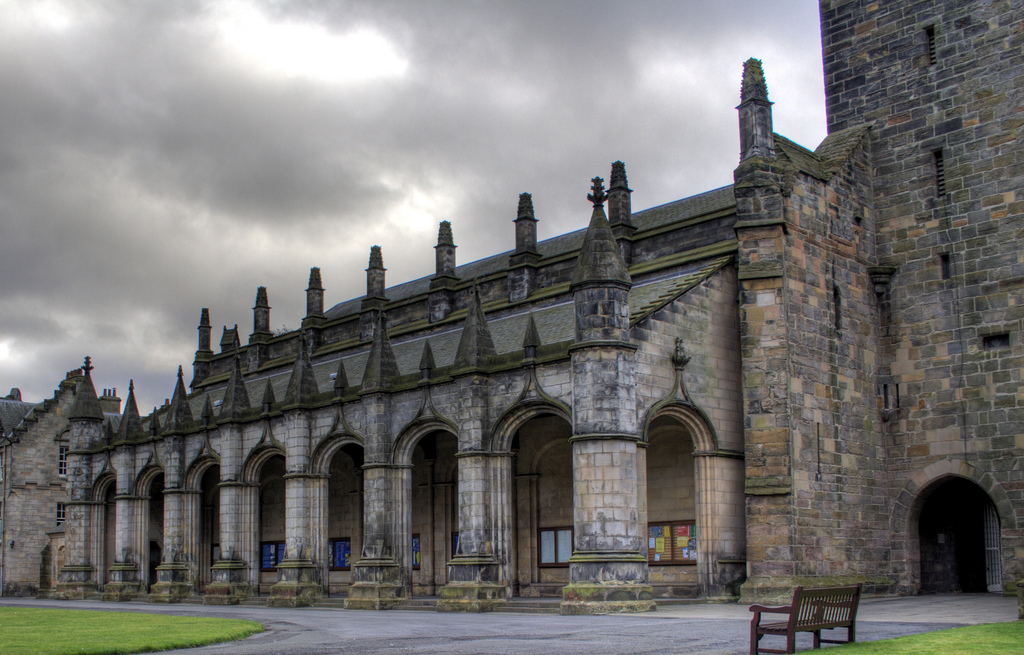
St Salvator's College of the University of St Andrews, built in 1450

There are fifteen universities based in Scotland, the Open University, and three other institutions of higher education.

The first university in Scotland was the University of St Andrews, founded in 1413, with St John's College being added in 1418 and St Salvator's College in 1450. The other great bishoprics followed, with the University of Glasgow being founded in 1451 and King's College, Aberdeen in 1495. St Leonard's College was founded at St Andrews in 1511 and St John's College was re-founded in 1538 as St Mary's College. Public lectures that were established in Edinburgh in the 1540s would eventually become the University of Edinburgh in 1582. A university briefly existed in Fraserburgh between 1592 and 1605. In 1641, the two colleges at Aberdeen were united by decree of Charles I (r. 1625–49), to form the ‘King Charles University of Aberdeen’. They were demerged after the Restoration in 1661. In 1747 St Leonard's College in St Andrews was merged into St Salvator's College to form the United College of St Salvator and St Leonard. A new college of St Andrews was opened in Dundee in 1883, though initially an independent institution. The two colleges at Aberdeen were considered too small to be viable and they were restructured as the University of Aberdeen in 1860. Marischal College was rebuilt in the Gothic style from 1900. The University of Edinburgh was taken out of the care of the city and established on a similar basis to the other ancient universities.

After the Robbins Report of 1963 there was a rapid expansion in higher education in Scotland. By the end of the decade the number of Scottish Universities had doubled. New universities included the University of Dundee, Strathclyde, Heriot-Watt, and Stirling. From the 1970s the government preferred to expand higher education in the non-university sector and by the late 1980s roughly half of students in higher education were in colleges. In 1992, the distinction between universities and polytechnic colleges/central institutions was removed. This created new universities at Abertay, Glasgow Caledonian, Edinburgh Napier, West of Scotland and Robert Gordon. In 2001 the University of the Highlands and Islands was created by a federation of 13 colleges and research institutions in the Highlands and Islands and gained full university status in 2011.

University	Image	Location	University grouping	Year of university status	Total HE students (2023/24)	Academic staff (2023/24)	Motto	Notes
University of St Andrews	The 15th-century St Salvator's Chapel in the winter sun	St Andrews	Ancient university	1413 (foundation 1410)	11,895	1,345	ΑΙΕΝ ΑΡΙΣΤΕΥΕΙΝ; Ever to excel	University status conferred on 28 August 1413 by a papal bull of Pope Benedict XIII.
University of Glasgow		Glasgow	Ancient university	1451	38,125	5,795	Via, Veritas, Vita; The way, the truth, and the life	University status conferred on 7 January 1451 by a papal bull of Pope Nicholas V.
University of Aberdeen	King's College, Aberdeen – geograph.org.uk – 108991	Aberdeen	Ancient university	1495	15,455	1,695	Initium sapientiae timor domini The beginning of wisdom is the fear of the Lord	Established as King's College, Aberdeen in 1495 by a papal bull of Pope Alexander VI, and in 1860 merged with Marischal College (established 1593 as Aberdeen's second university), explicitly maintaining the date of foundation of King's College.
University of Edinburgh		Edinburgh	Ancient university	1582	40,625	8,430	Nec temere, nec timide Neither rashly nor timidly	Established as the ‘Tounis College’ in 1582, after James VI of Scotland granted the Edinburgh Town Council a royal charter to establish a college on 14 April 1582.
University of Strathclyde	University of Strathclyde Campus, Glasgow	Glasgow	Chartered university	1964 (foundation 1796)	23,265	2,005	The Place of Useful Learning	The Royal College of Science and Technology was granted university status by royal charter in 1964, although the precursor Anderson Institute can be traced back to 1796 and the name Anderson's University was used between 1828 and 1887.
Heriot-Watt University		Edinburgh	Chartered university	1966 (foundation 1821)	10,665	965	Leaders in ideas and solutions	Heriot-Watt College was granted university status by royal charter in 1966, although the precursor School of Arts of Edinburgh was established in 1821.
University of Dundee		Dundee	Chartered university	1967 (foundation 1881)	14,990	1,490	Magnificat Anima Mea Dominum; My soul glorifies the Lord	First established (1881) as University College, then Queen's College under the University of St. Andrews, until establishment as an independent university in 1967.
University of Stirling		Stirling	Chartered university	1967	12,865	1,015	Innovation and Excellence	Planned as part of the Robbins Report of 1963, and constructed at a greenfield site on the estate of Airthrey Castle.
Edinburgh Napier University	Napier University Merchiston Campus	Edinburgh	Modern university	1992 (foundation 1964)	14,240	1,025	Nisi Sapientia Frustra; Without knowledge all is in vain	First established 1964 as Napier Technical College.
Robert Gordon University		Aberdeen	Modern university	1992 (foundation 1750)	14,585	685	Omni Nunc Arte Magistra; Now by all your mastered arts	First established 1750 as Robert Gordon's Hospital.
Glasgow Caledonian University		Glasgow	Modern university	1993 (foundation 1875)	21,965	825	For the Common Weal; For the common good	The university traces its origin to The Queen's College, Glasgow (founded 1875) and the Glasgow Polytechnic (founded 1971).
Abertay University	Library, University of Abertay, Dundee – geograph.org.uk – 1154390	Dundee	Modern university	1994 (foundation 1888)	4,950	215	Beatus homo qui invenit sapientiam Blessed is the man who finds wisdom	First established in 1888 as Dundee College of Technology.
Queen Margaret University		Musselburgh	Modern university	2007 (foundation 1875)	6,835	335	Head, Heart and Hand	First established 1875 as The Edinburgh School of Cookery and Domestic Economy. Moved to a new campus in Musselburgh in 2007–8.
University of the West of Scotland		Paisley, Hamilton, Dumfries and Ayr	Modern university	2007 (foundation 1836)	16,780	795	Doctrina Prosperitas; Success comes through learning	First established 1836 as a School of Arts, then in 1992 as the University of Paisley, and re-formed in 2007 following a merger with Bell College.
University of the Highlands and Islands	Executive Offices of the University of the Highlands and Islands, Inverness	Highlands and Islands, Moray and Perthshire	Modern university	2011 (foundation 2001)	9,530	80	Foghlam aig ìre Oilthigh air a' Ghàidhealtachd is anns na h-Eileanan; University-level study in the Highlands and Islands	A federation of colleges, planned from 1992 onwards and first established in 2001 as the UHI Millennium Institute and awarded full university status in February 2011. The central administration and largest college is in Inverness.

== See also ==
- Armorial of UK universities
- Carnegie Trust for the Universities of Scotland
- Education in Scotland
- List of further education colleges in Scotland
- Universities in Scotland
