= Oreke Mosheshe =

Oreke Mosheshe is a British actress, TV presenter, blogger and model.

== Background ==
Oreke graduated from Brunel University with a degree in management and law - modelling part-time to pay the bills. With a job in business development lined up, Oreke decided to take a year off after university 'to see the world'. She only got as far as her native North London however, as she was approached by publicity guru Camilla Storey to take up acting full-time. Oreke also studied drama at college, and the Meisner technique with Scott Williams at the Impulse school of acting.

== Career ==
Oreke has appeared in several BBC, ITV and Channel 4 productions. She can also be seen at the end of the year in British comedy 'rabbit fever' which has been voted best British comedy of the year by Toby Young (Tatler).

Oreke has featured alongside various British actors such as the late Sir John Mills, Lesley Sharp and James Nesbitt as well as Hollywood actors such as Ray Liotta. Her acting roles have taken her to Africa where she guest appeared in popular soap 'Sun City'.

Oreke has modelled for various fashion houses including Matthew Williamson, Vivienne Westwood, Armani and Joseph. She was the face of T-Mobile Web 'n' Walk campaign and has starred in the international Star beer campaign.

Oreke can be seen in several commercials ranging from high fashion to playing a young mum in a Huggies international campaign.

=== Film credits ===
- Lights2 - Action Hero, The Shadow (with Marcus Dillistone and Sir John Mills)
- Lights2; Return of The Shadow - Action Hero, The Shadow, sequel (with Marcus Dillistone and John Quentin)
- Revolver - Foxy: Dancer (with Guy Ritchie)
- Planespotting - Nkechi: Prisoner (with Chris Menaul and Francis Hopkinson Granada)
- Rabbit Fever - Rude Girl
- Double O - Lola: Secret Agent
- Johnny English - (with Rowan Atkinson and Peter Howitt)

=== Television acting ===
- The Lenny Henry Show - Model/Singer (BBC Television)
- 20 Things To Do Before You're 30 - Sarah (BBC Television)

=== Television presenting ===
- Live Roulette TV - Sky digital channel 847
- Hawaiian Tropics 2004 - International, E Channel
- Grab-a-Grand Game Show - Skytele Media
- Hawaiian Tropics International - E! Entertainment Channel
- Psychic Interactive Show - Skytele Media
- Spin and Win - Hollywood TV

=== Commercial modelling ===
- Africa Kicks - (BBC Television)
- Top of the Pops - (BBC Television)
- KFC
- Orange Mobile
- Nestle

=== Theatre ===
- Round and Round - Wrote and Directed
- The End - Solin Woman Show
- Cabaret - Charity Tour

=== Modelling ===
- Catwalk, House of Fraser
- Skin Care/ Fashion, GMTV
- Showroom, Armani Collective club 21
- Product Launch/Campaign, PlayStation
- Mathew Williamson, London Fashion Week
- Showroom, Vivienne Westwood
- Showroom, Joseph

=== Music videos ===
- Appleton - "Fantasy"
- Million Dan - "Dogs And Sledges"
- So Solid Crew - "Rid Wid Us"
- Adam F And Li'l Mo - "Where's My…"
- t.A.T.u. - "Not Gonna Get Us"

== Qualifications ==
- Scott Williams Impulse School of Acting (London)
- Ravenscroft College - Three years Theatre Studies
- RADA "Unarmed combat course" Led by Bret Young
- BBC Intensive Presenting course

== Miscellaneous ==
In 2006, Oreke came fifth in the Miss Great Britain contest.
