= Dianne Yerbury =

Australian academic

Dianne Yerbury AO (born 25 March 1941) is an Australian university administrator and company director. She was the Vice-Chancellor of Macquarie University, Sydney, Australia from 1987 to 2005.

She was Australia's first female Vice-Chancellor, and was also the longest serving Vice-Chancellor of Macquarie University. In 1987 she was also made Professor Emerita at the University of New South Wales.

Yerbury was made a Member of the Order of Australia (AM) in 1984 and elevated to Officer (AO) in 2001 for "service to tertiary education, particularly in developing the broader cultural and international mission of Australian universities and leading Macquarie University into significant new fields of scientific and social research, to the arts and to the community". Also in 2001, Yerbury was one of the inaugural inductees to the Victorian Honour Roll of Women.

She was named the 2002 Telstra New South Wales Business Woman of the Year. From 2003-04 she was vice-president, and from 2004-05 president, of the Australian Vice-Chancellors' Committee.

In 2006, it was announced that Yerbury would remain at Macquarie University in the role of Arts and Culture Ambassador and also as International Ambassador for the University. Following a long-running dispute with her successor Steven Schwartz over expenses, occupation of the vice-chancellorial residence and ownership of several million dollars' worth of art works, Yerbury left Macquarie University in February 2007.

Yerbury received an apology from the Fairfax Press:

APOLOGY TO DI YERBURY, AO

From February 8, 2007, the Herald published a number of articles in print and online, including a news blog, concerning Professor Di Yerbury who had served as Vice-Chancellor of Macquarie University for more than 19 years to February 2006. Professor Yerbury has alleged that the articles depicted her as dishonestly commingling her private art collection with the University's own art collection and failing honestly to account for her use of the University's credit card. The Herald at no time intended to convey any such allegations against Professor Yerbury.

If readers understood the articles as in any way reflecting upon her honesty and probity, the Herald withdraws those allegations and apologises for the hurt to Professor Yerbury and any damage to her reputation.
