= Edward Karavakis =

Greek computer scientist (born 1983)

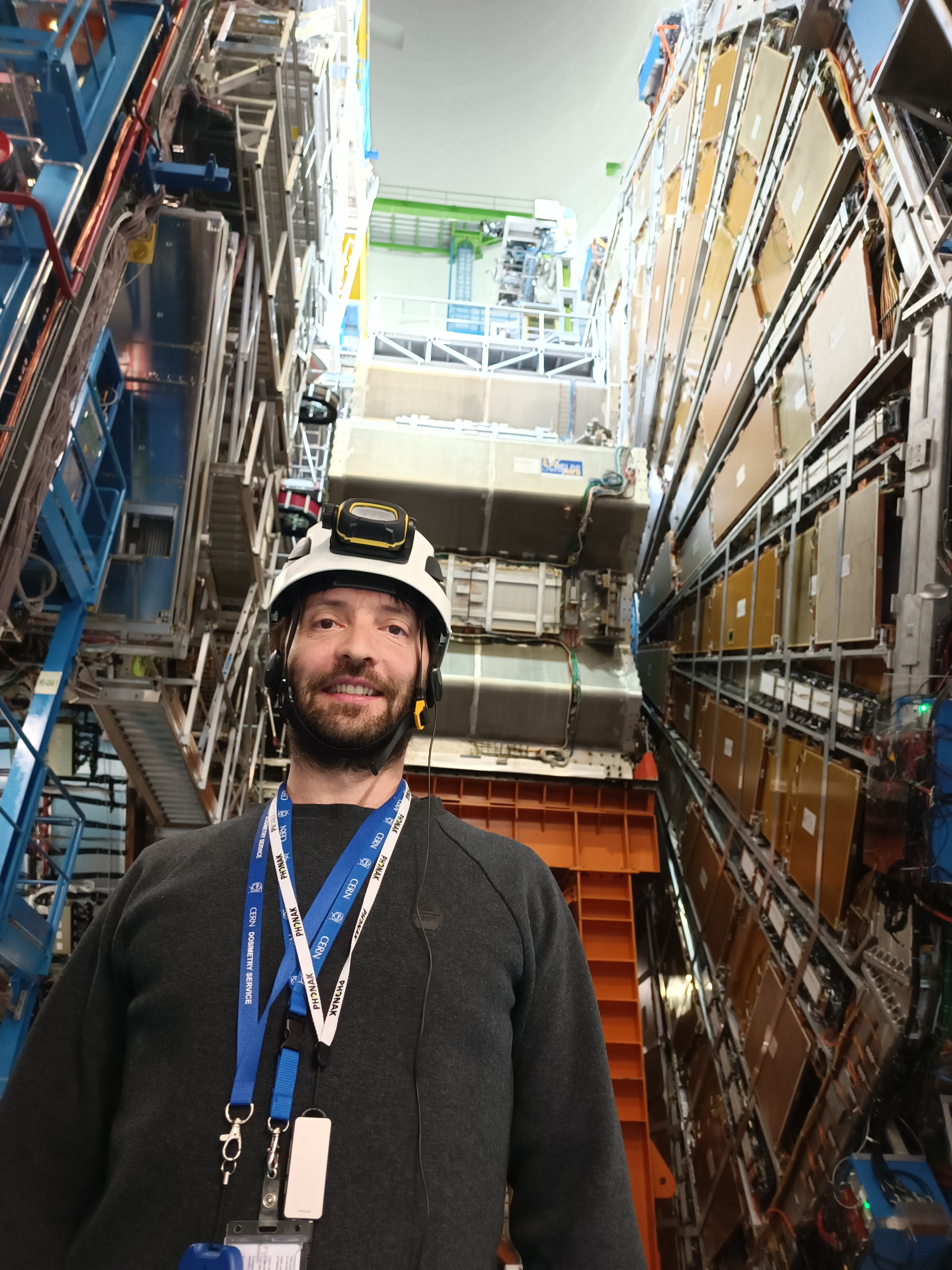
- Edward Karavakis in the ATLAS detector cavern at CERN, 2023
- Born: October 29, 1983 (age 42); Thessaloniki, Greece
- Education: BSc, University of East London; MSc, Brunel University; Ph.D., 2010, Brunel University
- Alma mater: Brunel University
- Scientific career
- Fields: Computer Science; Grid Computing
- Workplaces: Brookhaven National Laboratory, CERN
- Thesis: A distributed analysis and monitoring framework for the compact muon solenoid experiment and a pedestrian simulation (2010)
- Website: https://cern.ch/Edward.Karavakis

Edward Karavakis (Greek: Εδουάρδος Καραβάκης; born October 29, 1983) is a Greek computer scientist working as a Senior Applications Engineer at Brookhaven National Laboratory (BNL) stationed at CERN, the European Organization for Nuclear Research in Geneva, Switzerland.

== Early life and education ==
Karavakis completed his bachelor's degree in Computer Science in 2005 from the University of East London and his master's degree in Data Communication Systems in 2006 from Brunel University. He was then awarded three years of funding for his PhD research from the Engineering and Physical Sciences Research Council (EPSRC) in UK. In 2008, Karavakis started collaborating with the IT department of CERN for his doctoral research. He completed his doctorate degree in 2010 from Brunel University.

== Career ==
Upon completing his PhD, Karavakis was hired as a post-doctoral researcher in the IT department of CERN in 2010 and then hired as a CERN staff in 2013. In May 2022, Edward joined Brookhaven National Laboratory. Based at CERN in Geneva, Switzerland, he is a core member of the PanDA (Production and Distributed Analysis) Workload Management System project team. PanDA is a high-performance, scalable system designed to manage and distribute computational tasks across large-scale, distributed computing environments. This project plays an important role in supporting the ATLAS experiment at CERN, the Vera C. Rubin Observatory in Chile, and sPHENIX at BNL.

Before joining Brookhaven National Laboratory, Karavakis was the project leader of the File Transfer Service (FTS), the grid data transfer service used at the Worldwide LHC Computing Grid (WLCG). Other projects that Karavakis was involved with include the Experiment Dashboard Monitoring System for the WLCG and the MONIT monitoring project at CERN.

Edward Karavakis has been a supporter of the CERN & Society Foundation since 2019. His commitment to the charitable branch of CERN is exemplified by his active involvement in promoting its mission. In an internal campaign aimed at raising awareness among CERN personnel, Edward was invited to share his insights about the Foundation through a video interview. This initiative sought to highlight the Foundation's pivotal role in extending the reach and impact of CERN's activities beyond its core research, benefiting the wider public.
