= The Last Millionaire =

Television series

- Country of origin: United Kingdom
- Original language: English
- No. of series: 1
- No. of episodes: 6

Production
- Running time: 48 minutes

Original release
- Network: BBC Three
- Release: 13 November 2008 – 4 January 2009

The Last Millionaire is a British reality television show broadcast by the BBC. The series consists of British young entrepreneurs competing to see who can create the most profitable businesses in six cities across the world. They are tested on how successfully they can create a business from scratch in a different city in each episode. The winners are sent back to the UK as successful entrepreneurs, while the losers continue to compete to avoid being branded as the Last Millionaire.

== Content ==
The first episode of The Last Millionaire was broadcast on BBC Three on 13 November 2008.

== Winners ==
- 1. James Watt: Founder of BrewDog, a multinational brewery and pub chain based in Ellon, Aberdeenshire, Scotland.
- 2. Jacqueline Doherty: Managing Director of 2Fluid Creative, a creative agency.
- 3. Oli Norman: Founder of DADA PR, a public relations agency.
- 4. Oliver Zissman: cofounded Totally Fitness, a gym equipment rental business
- 5. Nathaniel Peat: Founder of The Safety Box, a multi-award winning social enterprise based in England.
- 6. Lianne Taylor (nee Miller): Founder of Young & Pure, a natural skincare products company
- 7. Carl Edouard Pihl: Founder of TicketingHub

a technology focused B2B cloud based ticketing platform, which specialises in the management of sales and inventory of tickets

- 8. James Taylor: Founder of a Sports based company
- 9. Jason Graham: Director of Below Zero & the Absolut Ice Bar
- 10. Dimple Sthankiva: Founder of the Dimpleyoga Group
- 11. Lucy Cohen: co-founder of Mazuma a multi award winning Accountacy Firm
- 11. Natalie Haywood: founder and Managing Director of the LEAF Group of companies, based in Liverpool
