= Scottish Further and Higher Education Association =

Trade union for lecturers in Scotland

The Scottish Further and Higher Education Association (SFHEA) was a trade union for lecturers employed in the further and higher education sectors.

== History ==
It was established as the Scottish Further Education Association (SFEA) in 1966, it changed its name in 1983. In 2003, it merged into the Educational Institute of Scotland.
