= Redbrick university =

Term for British universities founded in the late 19th and early 20th centuries

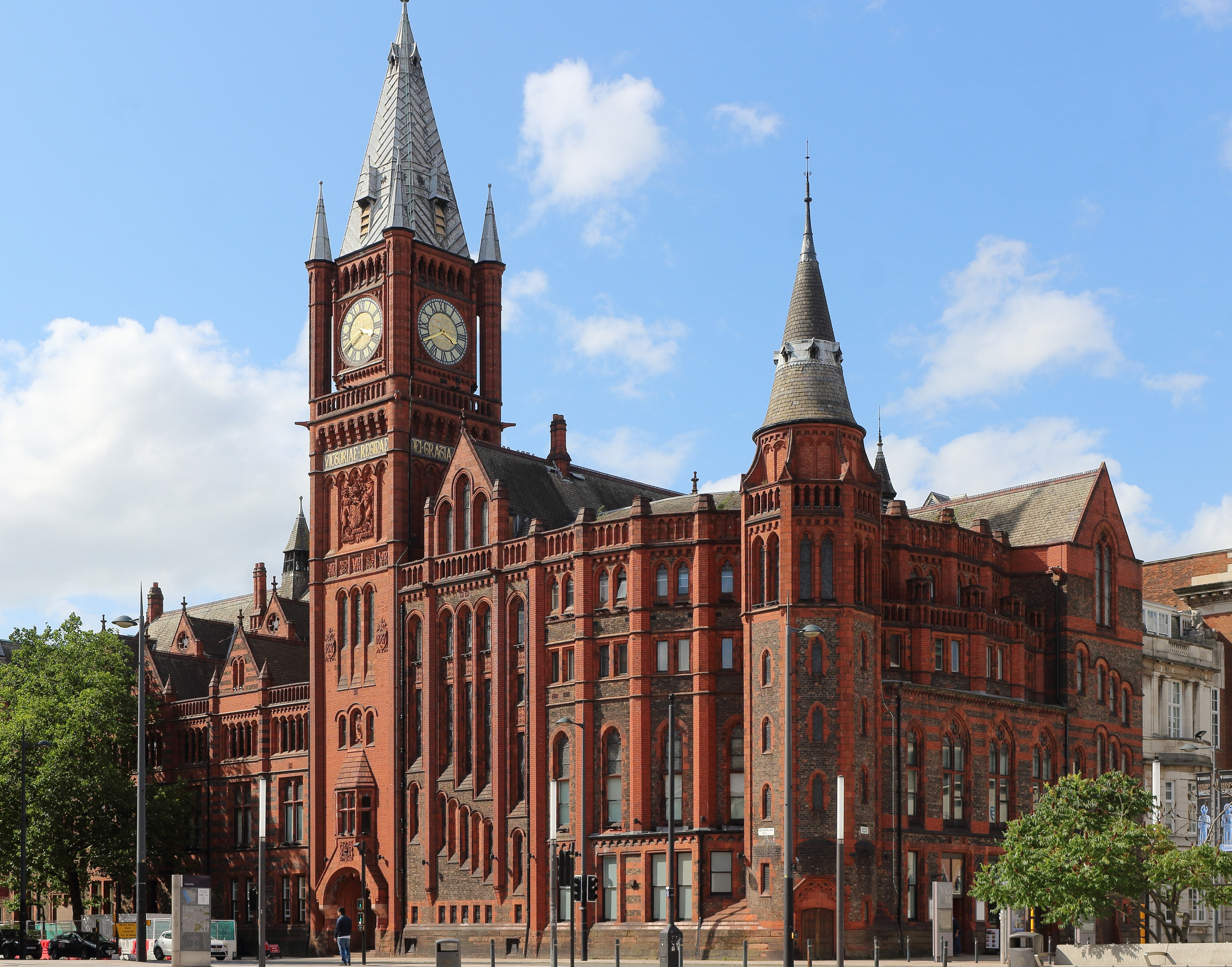
The Victoria Building of the University of Liverpool was the inspiration for the term "red brick university" which was coined by Professor Edgar Allison Peers.

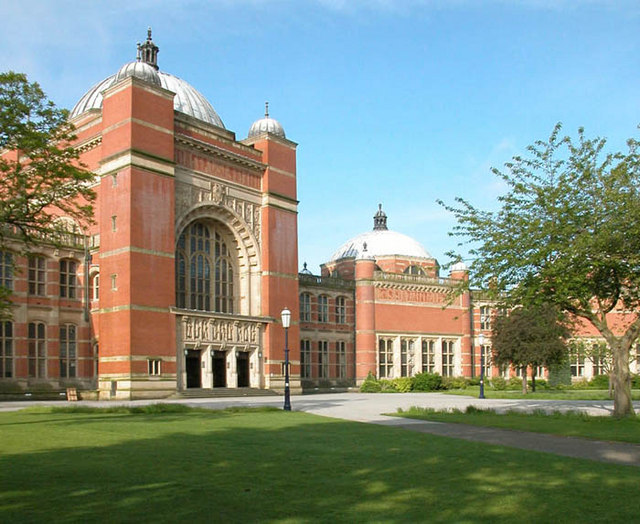
The Aston Webb building, University of Birmingham

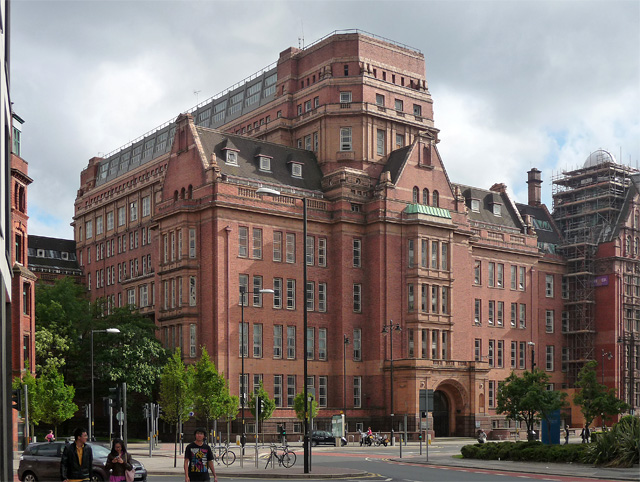
The Sackville Street Building of the University of Manchester

A redbrick university (or red-brick university) normally refers to one of the nine civic universities originally founded as university colleges in the major industrial cities of England in the second half of the 19th century. (Note: The term was coined by Bruce Truscot (Edgar Allison Peers) in Red Brick University, which states: "It is primarily with eight of the twelve English universities that this book is concerned: Birmingham, Bristol, Leeds, Liverpool, Manchester, Nottingham, Reading and Sheffield" (p. 25) and, with respect to Durham, that "its Newcastle college, perhaps, can properly find a place in this survey" (p. 24).)

However, with the 1960s proliferation of plate glass universities and the reclassification of polytechnics in the Further and Higher Education Act 1992 as post-1992 universities, all British universities founded in the late 19th and early 20th centuries in major cities are now sometimes referred to as "redbrick".

Six of the original redbrick institutions, or their predecessor institutes, gained university status before World War I and were initially established as civic science or engineering colleges. Eight of the nine original institutions are members of the Russell Group.

== Origins of the term and use ==
The term red brick or redbrick was coined by Edgar Allison Peers, a professor of Spanish at the University of Liverpool, to describe the civic universities, while using the pseudonym "Bruce Truscot" in his 1943 book Redbrick University. Although Peers used red brick in the title of the original book, he used redbrick adjectivally in the text and in the title of the 1945 sequel. He is said to have later regretted his use of red brick in the title. The term red brick for this category of universities is used as a contrast to the older more established universities that were all stone masonry constructions. The use of bricks was seen as a cheaper and less traditional alternative and therefore not as highly regarded, reflected in the general view of these new universities compared to the established ones.

Peers's reference was inspired by the fact that the Victoria Building at the University of Liverpool (designed by Alfred Waterhouse and completed in 1892 as the main building for University College, Liverpool) is built from a distinctive red pressed brick, with terracotta decorative dressings. On this basis the University of Liverpool claims to be the original "red brick" institution, although the titular, fictional Redbrick University was a cipher for all the civic universities of the day.

While the University of Liverpool was an inspiration for the "red brick" university alluded to in Peers' book, receiving university status in 1903, the University of Birmingham was the first of the civic universities to gain independent university status in 1900 and the university has stated that the popularity of the term "red brick" owes much to its own Chancellor's Court, constructed from Accrington red brick. The University of Birmingham grew from the Mason Science College (opened two years before University College Liverpool in 1880), an elaborate red brick and terracotta building in central Birmingham which was demolished in 1962.

== Civic university movement ==
The civic university movement started with the foundation of Owens College in Manchester in 1851 and of other university colleges in major provincial cities in the later 19th century, where there was strong demand for a scientifically and technically educated workforce. Their focus on science and engineering is conventionally contrasted with the liberal arts focus of the ancient universities of Oxford and Cambridge and the pre-Victorian University of Durham (although Durham did establish Britain's first engineering school in 1837), owing their heritage more to University College London. However, some modern scholarship has challenged this, pointing out the influence of civic pride and the aim of combatting materialism on the founders of the civic colleges. Liverpool and Manchester, in particular, had strong humanities traditions dating to their early days as civic colleges. The redbrick universities developed out of these 19th-century university colleges, providing degrees initially through the external examinations of the University of London, through membership of the federal Victoria University, or through association with the University of Durham. From 1889, the government supported the eight redbrick colleges then in existence with grants; Reading was added to the grant in 1901.

Six of the civic colleges became universities prior to the first world war. Owens College assimilated the Royal School of Medicine and Surgery in 1872 and acquired university standing as the seat and founding college of the Victoria University in 1880. Following the break-up of the federal Victoria University in 1903 it and was renamed the Victoria University of Manchester in 1903; it merged with the University of Manchester Institute of Science and Technology (itself an autonomous part of the Victoria University of Manchester until 1994) to form the current University of Manchester in 2004. Mason Science College in Birmingham was established in 1875, becoming Mason University College in 1898 and then the University of Birmingham in 1900. The Yorkshire College of Science was founded in Leeds in 1874. In 1884 this merged with the Leeds School of Medicine (founded in 1831) and in 1886 joined the Victoria University before becoming an independent university in 1904. University College, Bristol was established in 1876 as the first university-level institution in Britain to admit both women and men. It merged with Bristol Medical School (founded 1833) in 1893 and became a university in 1909. University College, Liverpool was established in 1881 and became part of the Victoria University in 1884 and then an independent university in 1903. Firth College, Sheffield, was established in 1879. In 1897 this merged with Sheffield Medical School (founded 1828) and Sheffield Technical School (founded 1884), becoming University College, Sheffield. This became the University of Sheffield in 1905.

Of the redbricks that gained independent university status later, the science college in Newcastle was established in associated with Durham University in 1871, later being renamed Armstrong College, and became, with the medical college in Newcastle (established in 1834 and associated with Durham from 1852) the Newcastle division of the federal University of Durham in 1909. Armstrong College and the medical college merged in 1937 to form King's College, which became the independent University of Newcastle upon Tyne in 1963. Reading was established as an extension college by the University of Oxford in 1892, incorporating pre-existing schools of art and science; it became a university in 1926. Nottingham was established as a civic college in 1881 and students took external degrees of the University of London until it received its royal charter as a university in 1948.

Combined English Universities was a university constituency in the UK Parliament created by the Representation of the People Act 1918 for graduates of Durham University (including Newcastle) and the six pre-World War One redbricks (Birmingham, Bristol, Leeds, Liverpool, Manchester, and Sheffield). Graduates of Oxford, Cambridge, and London (including graduates from redbricks that had taken London degrees) had already been enfranchised and graduates of the University of Wales were enfranchised at the same time. Reading University was added to the Combined English Universities constituency in 1928 (prior to this its graduates, taking London degrees, would have joined the London constituency). The constituency was abolished in 1950.

| Name | University charter awarded | Predecessor institutions | Image | Notes |
|---|---|---|---|---|
| Victoria University | 1880 (defunct 1903) | Owens College, Manchester (1851); Royal School of Medicine and Surgery, Manchester (1824); Leeds School of Medicine (1831); Yorkshire College of Science (1874); University College Liverpool (1881) | | The Victoria University was a federal university based in Manchester with colleges in Manchester, Leeds and Liverpool. It was defunct by 1903 as the colleges sought independent university status, leading to the formation of the Victoria University of Manchester from the merger of the Victoria University with Owens College, Manchester, in 1903. This new institution later merged with UMIST to form the University of Manchester in 2004. |
| University of Birmingham | 1900 | Birmingham Medical School (1825); Mason Science College (1875); Mason University College (1898) | | The first independent civic university to be awarded full university status by Royal Charter. |
| University of Liverpool | 1903 | University College, Liverpool (1881) | | Part of the Victoria University from 1884. Gained independent university status in 1903. |
| University of Manchester | 1903 (as Victoria University of Manchester); 2004 (as University of Manchester) | Victoria University of Manchester (1903) (Royal School of Medicine and Surgery, Manchester (1824); Owens College, Manchester (1851); Victoria University (1880)); UMIST (1956) (Mechanics' Institute, Manchester (1824); Manchester Technical School (1883)) | | The federal Victoria University existed between 1880 and 1903. The Victoria University of Manchester was granted a royal charter as its successor institution in 1903 and merged with Owens College, which had previously merged with the Royal School of Medicine and Surgery in 1872. The Manchester Mechanics' Institute, formed in 1824, became the Manchester Technical School in 1884 and then UMIST in 1956; it merged with the Victoria University of Manchester in 2004 to form the current University of Manchester. |
| University of Leeds | 1904 | Leeds School of Medicine (1831); Yorkshire College of Science (1874) | | Yorkshire College of Science became Yorkshire College then merged with the School of Medicine in 1884. Part of the Victoria University from 1886 to 1903. |
| University of Sheffield | 1905 | Sheffield Medical School (1828); Firth College (1879); Sheffield Technical School (1884); University College of Sheffield (1897) | | |
| University of Bristol | 1909 | University College, Bristol (1876) | | |
| University of Reading | 1926 | University College Reading (1892) | | |
| University of Nottingham | 1948 | University College Nottingham (1881) | | |
| Newcastle University | 1963 | Newcastle upon Tyne College of Medicine (later Durham University College of Medicine) (1834); Durham College of Science (later Armstrong College) (1871); Merged to form King's College (1937) | | Truscot states in Red Brick that "[Durham's] Newcastle college, perhaps, can properly find a place in this survey" |

== Other institutions ==
Various other civic institutions with origins dating from the 19th and early to mid-20th centuries have also been described as "red brick". According to historian William Whyte of the University of Oxford, Truscot's original definition includes the University of Dundee (originally an independent university college before becoming a constituent college of the University of St Andrews, and also in receipt of the grant to university colleges in 1889), Newcastle University (previously a college of the University of Durham, and noted by Truscot as "perhaps" being included), and the Welsh university colleges (not named, but could include Aberystwyth (1872), Cardiff (1883), Bangor (1885) and Swansea (1920)). Whyte does not include Reading or Nottingham, which Truscot lists in his second edition.

Many other institutions share similar characteristics to the original civic universities, particularly those in the second wave of civic universities before the advent of the plate glass universities in 1961. These universities were similar to the redbricks that gained university status prior to the First World War in that they evolved from local university colleges and (with the exception of Keele) awarded external degrees of the University of London before being granted full university status; they differ in that they became universities later, after the Second World War (with the exception of Reading) rather than before the First World War. The Robbins Report lists Reading, Nottingham, Southampton, Hull, Exeter, Leicester and Keele as being "younger civic universities".

Queen's University Belfast gained university status in 1908 during the same period as the English redbrick universities, having previously been established in 1845 as a college of the Queen's University of Ireland. As a result, it meets the dictionary definition of a redbrick university, and is sometimes named as such.

Department for Education research in 2016 split universities into four categories: ancient (pre-1800), red brick (1800–1960), plate glass (1960-1992), and post-1992.

== See also ==
- Ancient universities
- Ancient universities of Scotland
- Plate glass university
- Post-1992 university
- Campus university
- List of universities in the UK
