= Centre for Sustainability and Environmental Management / Brunel Management Programme =

The major activities of the Centre for Sustainability and Environmental Management / Brunel Management Programme (CSEM-BMP) are research, consultancy and post-graduate and seminar level education and training. All its activities are aimed at supporting the development of sustainable businesses in the UK and world-wide.

Professor Ross King is Joint Programme Director of CSEM-BMP.

== History ==
Date(s)	Name
1990-1993	Brunel Environmental Management Programme
1990	Environmental Management Centre
1999	Environmental Management Centre International
2004-2009	Centre for Sustainable and Environmental Management
2010	Centre for Sustainability and Environmental Management
2011	Centre for Sustainability and Environmental Management / Brunel Management Programme

CSEM-BMP was founded as the Brunel Environmental Management Programme (BEMP) or the Environmental Management Centre (EMC) within the Brunel Management Programme (BMP) by Ken Knight and Ross King. The EMC later became the Centre for Sustainable and Environmental Management (CSEM), then the Centre for Sustainability and Environmental Management (CSEM) and is now known as CSEM-BMP.

Through the EMC, BMP offered the first and largest broad senior level environmental management programme in Europe.

By 1993 the BEMP had organised 39 short courses, with 380 attendees.

The EMC established the first modular master's degree in Environmental Management in 1993 / 1994.

By the end of 1994 about 1000 managers had attended EMC courses.

From that time the focus of the EMC was on both identifying and disseminating the requisite management knowledge and theory so that directors and managers could lead their organizations towards economically advantageous environmental and social sustainability.

Work has been done by CSEM-BMP on management development provision for each business function (such as purchasing, operations, marketing, and logistics) rethinking the function from a sustainability perspective, so that each function can relieve overburdened environmental specialists.

== Sustainability Leadership Programme ==
In 2010 CSEM-BMP offered the Sustainability Leadership Programme (SLP) of Integrated Sustainability Management for Business. The programme offered by CSEM-BMP is for developing leadership and management. The programme is designed against the curriculum for an MBA, is based on sustainability principles and designed to meet the needs of each business function, process and level. It is designed for the needs of senior functional managers, those wishing to move into these positions, and those that need to communicate to such people. Being modular individual courses can be taken or combined in any combination including as a Masters programme.

Each module on the SLP comprise one week of study and an eight-week work-based assignment. Assignments on the SLP are generally to apply the material from the module and further reading to participant's own organisation in the form of a board level paper. Additional support is provided on the SLP in the form of tutorials and self organised learning groups.

The SLP highlights that any environmental or sustainability initiative requires a sound business case. It examines current management understanding and what needs to be done differently or better to operate with environmental and social limits. Core modules on the SLP help participants 'sit behind a chair' at the boardroom table, providing the ability to talk to board members and act as change agents in their organisation.

SLP contributors include 50+ associates. These associates are among the leaders in their respective fields.

== Commendations ==
Philip Sadler, CBE, former CEO of Ashridge Business School, Patron of the Tomorrowís Company Project has stated: ìCSEMís Sustainability Management Programme has long roots and huge experience and may be the Executive MBA of the future.î

In 2009 a programme review panel commended CSEM on:

- "a leading-edge programme providing what organisations need ...;
- the programme's pioneering nature giving learners business currency and practical information transfer;
- the design principles of the programme, the focus of the course design and the appropriate module content meeting students' need in creative ways;
- the tailoring of assignments to students' needs and those of their organisations;
- the learning set approach and the support it provides to students;
- the calibre of the tutors and the exceptional range of practitioner input."
