= Steven Schwartz (psychologist) =

American-Australian academic (born 1946)

Steven Schwartz AM (/ʃwɔːrts/ SHWORTS; born 5 November 1946) is an American and Australian academic and, until late 2012, the vice chancellor of Macquarie University in Sydney, Australia. He was previously vice chancellor of Brunel University in the UK and of Murdoch University in Western Australia. He is a trained psychologist and served both as senior academic and researcher, then as a university corporate manager. His style of management was controversial and attracted considerable opposition. He defended his record by saying that he wished universities to be more market-oriented, research-focused, accountable, transparent and held to higher standards, in the hope of improving university profiles and attracting more students, funding and researchers. Throughout his career he was successful in establishing new schools and facilities at the universities he was involved with.

== Education and early years ==
Steven Schwartz was born in New York City in 1946. After attending public schools, he entered Brooklyn College of the City University of New York. He was a National Merit Scholar finalist and he received a New York State Regent Scholarship. After leaving the City University of New York, he was commissioned an officer in the Public Health Service serving at the National Institute of Mental Health before completing a PhD degree at Syracuse University as a US Public Health Service Fellow. He has also worked as a journalist, authoring many articles for research journals, magazines and newspapers.

== Academic career ==
He began his academic career teaching at the Northern Illinois University. This led him to University of Texas Medical Branch where he was a full-time researcher in psychiatry. In 1978 he moved to Australia to take up the position of Senior Lecturer in clinical psychology at the University of Western Australia in Perth. In 1980, he transferred to the University of Queensland first as reader and then as professor of psychology. He also served as visiting professor at Stanford University in 1983 and Harvard University in 1987.

Over these years, Schwartz's research spanned clinical psychology, psychiatry, public health and medical decision making. He published over 100 articles in scientific journals, and 13 books including Medical Judgement and Decision Making (with Timothy Griffin), Childhood Psychopathology (with James Johnson, two editions), Pavlov’s Heirs and a well-known textbook on abnormal psychology, Abnormal Psychology, A Developmental Approach.

Schwartz was named one of the 100 highest cited researchers in his field and he received many recognitions including a World Health Organization Fellowship, a NATO fellowship and the Australian Academy of Science-Royal Society (London) Exchange Fellowship. He was elected by his peers to the Academy of Social Sciences and he was elected Morris Leibovitz Fellow at the University of Southern California. Schwartz is a Fellow of the Royal Society of the Arts, the Australian Institute of Company Directors, and the Australian Institute of Management. He was a visiting Fellow of Wolfson College, Oxford and he won the Brain Research Award of the British Red Cross Society. He was elected the first President of Sigma Xi, The Scientific Research Society in Australia and was awarded the distinguished Career Scientist Award by the National Institutes of Health. He served on the editorial boards of many scientific journals and was a fellow of many learned societies.

In 1988, he was appointed head of the University of Queensland Psychology Department and then elected by the academic staff of the university to be president of the academic board, a position to which he was re-elected for a second term. His experience as head and then president gave him an interest in administration which he followed by moving back to Perth to take up the position of executive dean in the School of Medicine and Dentistry at the University of Western Australia. He was the first medical dean in Australia who was not a medical doctor. Although there was some scepticism about this among the medical establishment, Schwartz overcame this and his management came to the attention of the Murdoch University search committee which appointed Schwartz Vice Chancellor in 1996.

== Vice chancellorships ==
=== Murdoch University ===
During his tenure at Murdoch University he introduced a number of Feeder Colleges, restructured the University to become more research-focused and developed new courses to attract additional students. He also designed and built a branch campus at Rockingham (which won the Prime Minister's Institutional Award in 1998). To provide a permanent endowment for the University, he undertook a $100 million land development program, which included a housing estate, obtained ISO9000 quality approval for administrative functions, outsourced non-core business operations such as catering, won the WA Premier's Award for public sector management in 2000, the Prime Minister's National Employer of the Year in 2000, the Telstra National Employer of the Year 2000 and 2002, the Prime Minister's Teaching Award 1998 and began a mentoring program for women. In 2001, in the midst of union activity over a new contract and the protection of low enrolment courses, the members of the local union branch issued a vote of no confidence in him.

=== Brunel University ===
At the end of 2002, Schwartz was appointed Vice Chancellor of Brunel University in the United Kingdom: a university with 2,400 staff, 13,000 students and a yearly budget of £140+ million. Brunel had decided under Michael Sterling, the previous VC, to refocus its mission on research. To help achieve this goal, the university under Schwartz sought to hire new research active staff, and, to help fund this, to reduce the number of non-research active staff (43 eventually accepted voluntary redundancy). The redundancy programme was highly controversial and was fiercely resisted by staff unions who ran a highly personalised campaign against Schwartz. As a part of the repositioning of the university, the Department of Geography and Earth Sciences was closed and the staff that didn't leave were redeployed (and one accepted voluntary redundancy). Despite the depleted staff base, Geography was still deemed strong enough to be returned in the 2008 RAE when it received an average score of 2.15 out of a possible 5. Schwartz's changes were supposed to produce increased research output and RAE ratings, bolstering the economic viability of the university. Brunel moved up the university league tables, (but has since fallen back), international income doubled, entry scores of students rose, the first venture capital trust for a university was established, and management was completely restructured. Similar to the experience at Murdoch, cutbacks led to staff action, including picketing and paid ads on Google.

In 2004, Schwartz was asked by the British government to chair an inquiry into university admissions. This inquiry became the focus of much political interest and media coverage. The Schwartz report was completed in September 2004 and its recommendations were far-reaching and controversial. The reports can be found at Schwartz also led a national project on ethics for universities sponsored by the Council for Industry and Higher Education and Universities UK.

In 2007, a tribunal found Schwartz guilty of victimisation by an employment tribunal after he publicly implied that two members of Brunel staff had made unwarranted claims against the university. In 2005, after the two staff members had lost claims of race discrimination against the university, Professor Schwartz emailed all of the staff criticising the pair (although neither were named). Bemoaning the expense of defending the cases, he referred to the two as having made "unwarranted demands for money" and described their claims as "unfounded", "unmeritorious" and "futile". The tribunal concluded that the claimants' sense of grievance was reasonable and justified: "Professor Schwartz's assertion that the claimants had made unwarranted demands for money was an implicit assertion of dishonesty on their part," it said. The earlier tribunal, while dismissing the cases of discrimination, had accepted that they were made in good faith. The tribunal awarded the two claimants £7,500 each as compensation for injury to their feelings, and said that, as Professor Schwartz and the university were equally responsible, so each should be liable for half of each award.

=== Macquarie University ===
In 2006, Schwartz left Brunel, returning to Australia to take up the position of vice chancellor at Macquarie University where he made similar changes to those imposed at Brunel. Arguing that he sought to refocus the university around peaks of research excellence, he said that this would mean "moving from teaching the subjects teachers want to teach to the subjects students want to learn; ensuring institutional success rather than ensuring morale; and decentralising responsibility and accountability". He added more than 85 new research active staff, including a new group of postgraduate medical researchers, attracted hundreds of millions in new development funds and the university rose in the Shanghai Jiao Tong ratings. In June, 2012, Macquarie was ranked 16 in the world in the QS rankings of 50 universities under 50 years of age and 32 in the world by a similar poll published by the THES In both cases, Macquarie was ranked first or tied first in Australia. In May 2008, he announced a search for an additional 43 staff. Schwartz has had to deal with a difficult legacy. There were run-ins with the former vice-chancellor, Di Yerbury. Union action was taken over staff contract conditions and issues regarding faculty and department funding. Schwartz has overseen considerable cuts to the university's infrastructure (though actually $1 billion was spent on infrastructure during his tenure including the new library, Macquarie University Hospital, the Hearing Hub and the Cochlear Building). Schwartz had:

- Planned to shut down the post-graduate student representative association (MUPRA). The dispute has continued after Schwartz left the university.
- Remove the position of student groups co-ordinator and replace it with a more workable system.
- Removed the honours programs for most degrees and replaced them with the master's degree.

Macquarie University announced on 13 April 2012 that Professor S Bruce Dowton would succeed Schwartz as vice-chancellor. Schwartz left the role after six years in office and is the university's shortest-serving vice chancellor. Schwartz was 66 at retirement and his contract had already been extended by two years. He went on to a visiting position at Oxford University.

== Other roles ==
Schwartz is the chairman of the Australian-American Fulbright Commission and a member of the advisory boards of the Asia Society, the Global Foundation and the Centre for Independent Studies, an Australasian libertarian thinktank "actively engaged in supporting a free enterprise economy and a free society under limited government where individuals can prosper and fully develop their talents". He is the chair of the Minister's advisory committee on the Bologna Process. He also represents Australia on the Council of the University of the South Pacific. He is currently a senior fellow on the World Research, Advisory and Education Team of MindChamps.

== Books authored ==
- Schwartz, S.; Johnson, J. H. (1981). Psychopathology of childhood: An experimental approach. New York: Pergamon. ISBN 9780080309354.
- Schwartz, S. (1984). Measuring reading competence: a theoretical-prescriptive approach. New York: Plenum. pp. 343. ISBN 978-0-306-41749-8.
- Schwartz, S.; Johnson, J. H. (1985). Psychopathology of childhood (Revised second ed.). New York: Pergamon. ISBN 978-0-08-030935-4.
- Schwartz, S.; Griffin, T. (1986). Medical thinking: The psychology of medical judgment and decision-making. (Italian Edition: Bollati Boringhieri Editore, 1991). New York: Springer-Verlag. ISBN 978-0-387-96315-0.
- Schwartz, S. (1986). Classic studies in psychology. (German Edition: Beltz-Verlag, 1991). Palo Alto, CA: Mayfield. pp. 196. ISBN 978-0-87484-796-3.
- Schwartz, S. (1987). Pavlov's heirs. London & Sydney: Angus and Robertson. ISBN 978-0-207-15124-8.
