= Nathaniel Peat =

British businessman

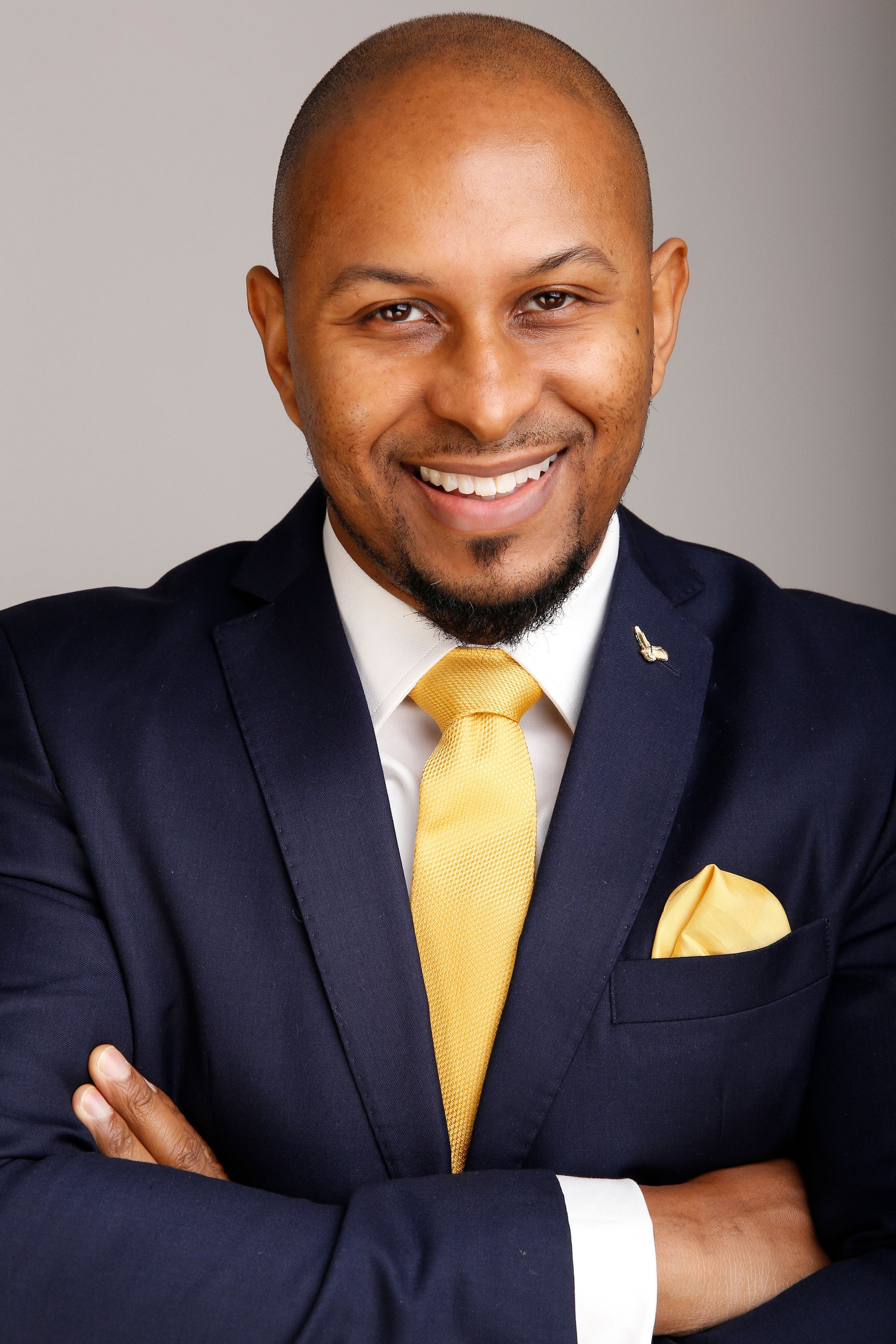
- Education: Brunel University - BEng (hons) Mechanical Engineering, MSc Advanced Manufacturing Systems
- Occupation: Entrepreneur
- Years active: 2007–present
- Website: www.nathanielpeat.com

Nathaniel Peat is a British-Jamaican social entrepreneur and international motivational speaker known for his work in youth empowerment, renewable energy, and diaspora engagement. He is the founder of The Safety Box, a nonprofit organisation focused on violence prevention and youth development, and a co‑founder of Gennex, a renewable‑energy company operating in East Africa.

Peat is also a co‑founder and patron of the EY Foundation, which supports young people facing barriers to employment.

Peat has served in several advisory roles, including as the Global Jamaica Diaspora Council Representative for the South of the United Kingdom and as a member of the Lloyds Banking Group Black Business Advisory Committee. His work spans social impact, climate action, diaspora policy, and support for underrepresented communities in business and education.

== Career ==
Entrepreneurship and Early Work

In 2006, Peat founded the nonprofit organisation The Safety Box, which uses grassroots methods to interrupt violent behaviour, build entrepreneurship, and support achievement in young people through alternative curriculum programmes in British schools and prisons. That same year, he appeared on the BBC Three reality television series The Last Millionaire, winning the third episode set in Cairo. Peat was a co‑founder of Gennex, a renewable‑energy company established in Kenya in 2013. He is also a co‑founder of the EY Foundation, where he initially served as a trustee before later being appointed a patron.

Awards and Recognition

In 2015, Peat received the Governor-General's Achievement Award for Excellence, presented by His Excellency the Most Hon. Sir Patrick Allen, recognising his contributions to the Jamaican diaspora. In 2016, he was listed in The Financial Times UPstanding Leaders Powerlist. In 2018, he was named to the newspaper's list of the Top 100 minority ethnic leaders in technology.

== Speaking Engagements ==
Peat delivered a TEDx talk titled Learning by Doing – Connecting rural African women to science, innovation & technology on 20 February 2018 at TEDxBrunel. In 2024, he was invited by the International Organization for Migration (IOM) to speak at the United Nations COP29 in Baku, Azerbaijan, as part of the organisation's efforts to highlight the role of diaspora communities in global climate action.

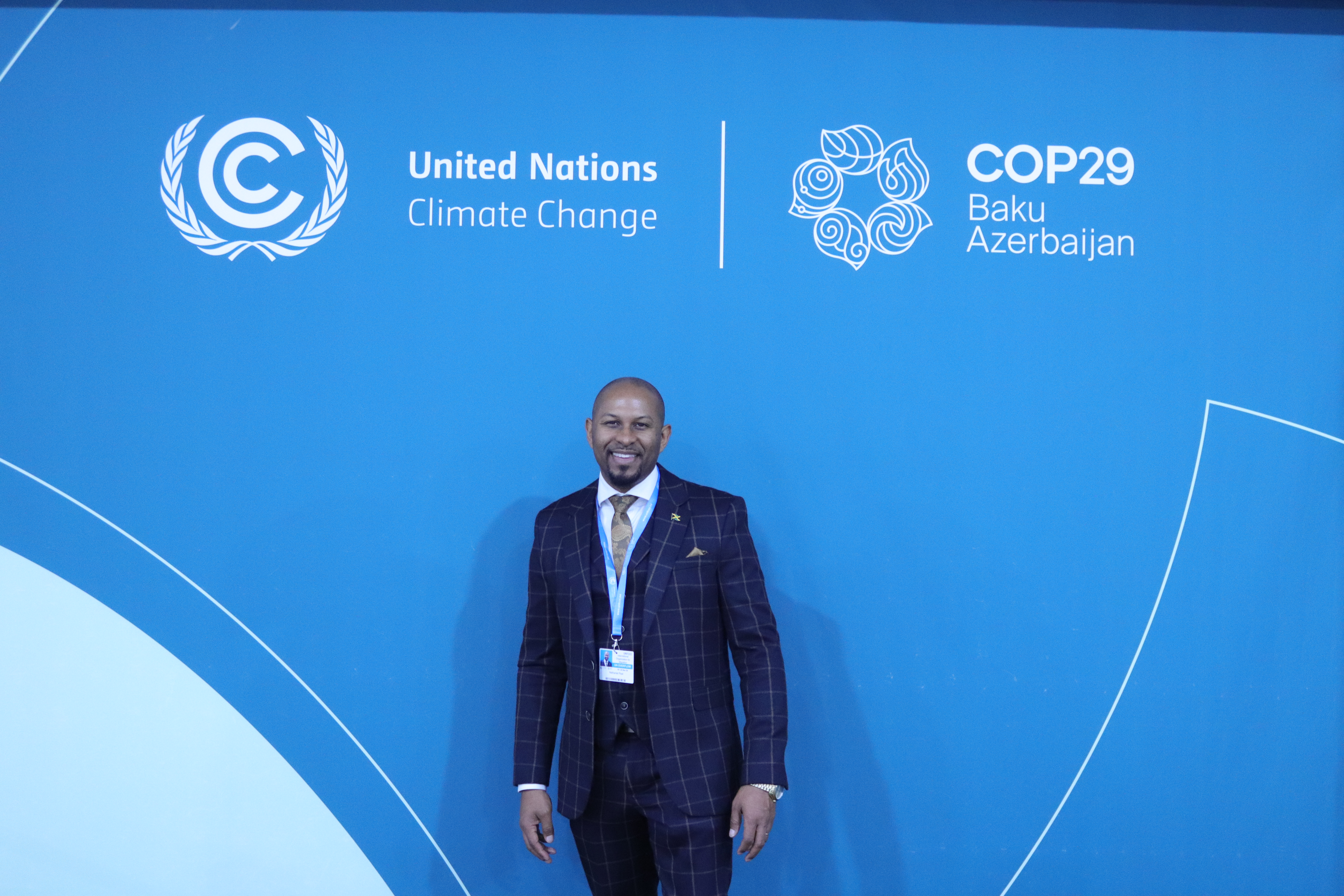
Peat speaking at COP29 in Baku, Azerbaijan (2024).

His participation formed part of the IOM's Diaspora for Climate Action (D4C) programme, which aims to integrate diaspora voices into national and international climate discussions. COP29 took place from 11 to 22 November 2024.

== Consultative and Advisory Roles ==
Peat has served as the Global Jamaica Diaspora Council Representative for the South of the United Kingdom, elected for two consecutive terms (2020–2023 and 2023–2026). In this capacity, he acted as a consultative advisor to Jamaica's Ministry of Foreign Affairs and Foreign Trade, contributing to diaspora engagement, trade and investment and humanitarian initiatives. Since 2021, Peat has served as a member of the Lloyds Banking Group Black Business Advisory Committee, which guides on improving outcomes for Black‑owned businesses in the United Kingdom.
