= Julia Buckingham =

British pharmacologist, academic and academic administrator

Dame Julia Buckingham DBE FRSA FMedSci FCGI FRSB

Vice Chancellor of Brunel University London
- In office October 2012 – December 2021
- Succeeded by: Andrew Jones

Personal details
- Born: 18 October 1950 (age 76) UK
- Profession: University Vice Chancellor
- Scientific career
- Education: Sheffield University (BSc); University of London (PhD, DSc)
- Fields: Pharmacology

Dame Julia Clare Buckingham (born 18 October 1950) is a British pharmacologist, academic and academic administrator. She is the former Vice Chancellor of Brunel University London, UK.

== Early life ==
Buckingham was born on 18 October 1950. She attended St Mary's School, Calne from 1960 to 1968. In 1968, she then went to the University of Sheffield where she obtained a BSc degree in zoology in 1971. She received her PhD in pharmacology from the University of London, Royal Free Hospital School of Medicine in 1974. In 1987, she was awarded a DSc degree in endocrine pharmacology from the same university.

== Career ==
Buckingham started her career in 1971 as a research assistant at Glaxo Laboratories, UK. From 1974–1980, she became a research fellow at the department of pharmacology, University of London. From 1980–1987, she became a senior lecturer at the same university. From 1988–1997, she became a professor of pharmacology and was head of department of pharmacology, Charing Cross and Westminster Hospital, University of London. From 1992–1997, she became the assistant Dean. In 1997, she moved to Imperial College London to be professor of pharmacology. In 2000, she became the college Dean in nonclinical medicine at Imperial College London. In 2007, she became Pro-rector (education) and in 2010 she became Pro-rector (education and academic affairs) at the same university.

In 2012, she left Imperial College London to be Vice Chancellor of Brunel University London. In August 2019, she additionally became the President of Universities UK. Following the announcement of her intention to leave Brunel, she became Chair of the Institute of Cancer Research on 1 August 2021.

== Awards ==
In 2010, Buckingham received a Fellowship of the City and Guilds of London Institute (FCGI). She was elected an honorary member of the British Society for Neuroendocrinology in 2011. In 2014, she was awarded as an Honorary Fellow of the British Pharmacological Society (HonFBPhS). In 2017, she received the Society for Endocrinology Jubilee Medal. In the 2018 Birthday Honours, she was appointed a Commander of the Order of the British Empire (CBE) by Queen Elizabeth II "for services to biology and education". Buckingham was elected a Fellow of the Academy of Medical Sciences (FMedSci) in 2019. She is also a Fellow of the Royal Society of Biology (FRSB) and a Fellow of the Royal Society of Arts (FRSA). In the 2025 New Year Honours, Buckingham was promoted to a Dame Commander of the Order of the British Empire (DBE) by King Charles III "for services to higher education".

== Selected works ==
- Buckingham, Julia C.; Gillies, Glenda E.; Cowell, Anne-Marie, eds. (1997). Stress, stress hormones, and the immune system. Chichester, England: Wiley. ISBN 978-0471958864.
