= Robbins Report =

1963 British government report on education

The Robbins Report (the report of the Committee on Higher Education, chaired by Lionel Robbins) was commissioned by the British government and published in 1963. The committee met from 1961 to 1963. After the report's publication, its conclusions were accepted by the government on 24 October 1963.

The report recommended immediate expansion of universities, and that all colleges of advanced technology should be given the status of universities. Consequently, the number of full-time university students was to rise from 197,000 in the 1967–68 academic year to 217,000 in the academic year of 1973–74 with "further big expansion" thereafter.

The report also concluded that university places "should be available to all who were qualified for them by ability and attainment" (the so-called Robbins principle) and that such institutions should have four main "objectives essential to any properly balanced system: instruction in skills; the promotion of the general powers of the mind so as to produce not mere specialists but rather cultivated men and women; to maintain research in balance with teaching, since teaching should not be separated from the advancement of learning and the search for truth; and to transmit a common culture and common standards of citizenship."

Chapter X recommended the establishment of the Council for National Academic Awards.

Robbins subsequently became the first chancellor of the University of Stirling in 1968.

The senior research officer for the committee that drew up the report was economist Richard Layard.
