= Chichester High School For Boys =

Former English school for boys

Chichester High School for Boys

Location
- Chichester, West Sussex, PO19 8AE; England; 50°49′51″N 0°46′35″W

Information
- Type: Comprehensive school (1929–2013); Academy school (2013–2016)
- Motto: Latin: Abeunt Studia in Mores (Studies Build One’s Character)
- Established: 1929
- Closed: 30 September 2016 (Merged to become the Chichester High School)
- Sister school: Chichester High School for Girls
- Department for Education URN: 140106 Tables
- Ofsted: Reports
- Gender: Boys (11 to 16); Mixed (16 to 18)
- Age: 11 to 18
- Capacity: 1514
- Language: English
- Houses: Canute; Henry; Friar; Story
- Former pupils: Old Cicestrians

Chichester High School for Boys, or CHSB, was a boys' secondary school with academy status, located in the city of Chichester, West Sussex, England. It was formed in 1971 during the schools reformation act of the 1970s by the amalgamation of two established schools; The Lancastrian School (established 1895) and the High School for Boys (established 1929). In 2016, Chichester High School for Boys merged with Chichester High School for Girls, to become just Chichester High School. This occurred after speculation that the two schools would merge, starting from 2014. The new school would adopt purple as its main colour, replacing the previous boys' school green and girls' school navy.

== History ==
=== Early history (1929–1971) ===
The Chichester High School for Boys was founded in 1929.

During World War II, children were evacuated from large cities to protect them from The Blitz. Pupils from the Henry Thornton School in London attended Chichester High School for Boys from October 1939 to July 1943. The school had a rule that if the air raid siren sounded before 5 pm there would be no homework that day.

=== Amalgamation with the Lancastrian School (1971–2013) ===
The Chichester High School for Boys and the Lancastrian School for Boys were amalgamated in 1971. The sister schools of the Chichester High School for Girls and the Lancastrian School for Girls were also amalgamated at the same time.

=== Academy status (2013–2016) ===
The Chichester High School for Boys converted to Academy status on 1 September 2013 and was taken over by The Kemnal Academies Trust (TKAT).

In July 2015, Ofsted conducted a full inspection and gave the school a 'Requires Improvement' rating.

In September 2016, the Chichester High School for Boys and the Chichester High School for Girls were amalgamated into the Chichester High School.

== Uniform ==
The Boys and Girls High Schools have merged, so the uniform has changed as of 2016. Since the boys' and girls' schools merged in 2016 purple blazers are worn, along with purple ties, with stripes of each house colour.

== Headteachers ==
Lancastrian School

- Rev. John Deacon (1845)
- Rev. Peter Chris (1853)
- Rev. Edward Saunders (1859)
- William Lewis (1867)
- James Thompson (1873)
- Richard P Usher (1888)
- Thomas Hayes (1892)
- Dr. Samuel Gardner (1905)
- Beilert Valance (1919)
- John Patrick (1928)
- Edwin Bishop (1937)
- Neil Young (1942) (acting)
- Alexander Few (1943)
- Paul Stanley (1957)
- Dr. Peter Bishop (1953)

Chichester High School for Boys

- H F Collins MA (London)(1928)
- Doctor E W Bishop (1934)
- Alfred A Scales (Acting) (1953–1954)
- Kenneth D Anderson MA (Oxon.) (1954)
- Dennis Watkins (1972)
- Sebastian Green (1977)
- Simon Neil (1979)
- Ron L Austin (1987)
- Mrs Diane Dockrell (1998)
- John Robinson (2005–2009)
- Gavin Salvesen-Sawh (2010–2014)
- Gary Potter (2014–2015) (Acting)

Chichester High School

- Mrs Yasmin Maskatiya (2015–2018)
- Mrs Joanne McKeown (2018-

== Notable alumni ==
=== Arts ===
- Neil Bartlett – writer, director, actor
- Howard Brenton – playwright
- Michael Elphick (1946–2002) – actor (Lancastrian School for Boys)
- Adrian Noble – Chief executive from 1990 to 2003 of the Royal Shakespeare Company
- David Wood – actor, playwright

=== Entertainment ===
- Joseph Garrett (youtuber)

=== Armed forces ===
- Air Chief Marshal Sir Brendan Jackson
- Major Timothy Peake – Army Air Corps Apache test pilot and astronaut for the European Space Agency
- Admiral Sir Bertram Home Ramsay
- General Sir Neil Methuen Ritchie
- Brigadier Mike Stone (defence) – chief information officer of the Ministry of Defence
- Pilot Officer James Meaker – RAF flying ace during the Second World War

=== Education ===
- Martin Hall – Vice-Chancellor of the University of Salford since 2009
- Patrick Allen (music educator) – author and teacher
- S. Barry Cooper – Mathematician
- Alan Howard Ward – Physicist

=== Sport ===
- Douglas Bunn – founded Hickstead in 1960
- John Snow – English Test cricketer
- Jimmy Hill – English footballer and ex-Chairman of the Professional Footballers' Association. Attended the school when evacuated from London during World War II.
- Sean Heather – Sussex cricketer
- Adam Webster – English footballer
- Kieran Low – Scottish rugby player – plays 1st team for London Irish RFC and Scotland
- Danny Gray – English rugby union player – played England Sevens from 2006 to 2007

=== Politics ===
- Sir Jon Shortridge – Permanent Secretary of the Welsh Office
- Sir Dudley Gordon Smith – Conservative MP for Warwick and Leamington from 1968 to 1997
