= Michael Harloe =

Professor Michael Harloe (born 11 October 1943) was the Vice-Chancellor of the University of Salford between 1997 and 2009, and is a social scientist who has worked for many years on issues of urban and regional development.

He was formerly Dean of Social Sciences and Pro-Vice-Chancellor Research at the University of Essex. He is currently on the Council of the Academy of Social Sciences and in 2013 was the Acting Chair of the Campaign for Social Science.

Academic offices
| Preceded by Professor Thomas Mutrie Husband | Vice-Chancellor of the University of Salford; 1997–2009 | Succeeded by Professor Martin Hall |
