= Death of Mason Pendrous =

Death of a New Zealand student

Mason Drake Pendrous (2000–2019) was a New Zealand student who died at a hall of residence owned by Campus Living Villages whilst studying at the University of Canterbury. His death raised concerns about the welfare of young students staying at student accommodation in New Zealand after his body laid undiscovered in his room for between two and four weeks, although the exact timeframe remains unclear.

Pendrous' death made headlines in New Zealand and garnered international media attention, resulting in a number of investigations including by police, and a response from the New Zealand education minister ultimately leading to law reform. The incident also prompted other universities to review the pastoral care at their halls of residence, and prompted discussion about the decline in the quality of care provided by companies managing student accommodation.

Investigations into the incident were unable to determine a cause of death. An independent investigation conducted on behalf of the University of Canterbury found that Campus Living Villages had failed to adequately follow processes to monitor student welfare. Coroner Sue Johnson, who handled the case, concluded that there was no evidence to show Pendrous' death was avoidable, and was likely due to natural causes.

In 2020, a cherry tree was dedicated to the memory of Pendrous in the surrounding gardens of the historic Ilam homestead. In 2021, Campus Living Villages sold their property assets in Christchurch to Cedar Pacific, with management of the properties handed to UniLodge in October that year.

== Background ==
Pendrous, then 19 years old, was in his first year of a bachelor's degree in e-commerce. He occupied room 209 in the Hinoki building at the Sonoda student hall of residence, one of several facilities owned and run by Campus Living Villages (CLV). Pendrous was from Wellington and had formerly attended Scots College. He was a member of the school rowing team. Pendrous' family and friends described him as a "good and confident guy", outgoing, and a busy student who enjoyed computer gaming and would sometimes spend several days alone presumably engaged in the hobby.

Pendrous had a close relationship to his step-father, Anthony Holland, who raised Pendrous from a young age alongside his mother who had died of breast cancer in 2014. Holland claimed Pendrous was in "good spirits", had been excited about university and seemed to be enjoying university life, and appeared to have no mental health issues. However, it has been claimed that Pendrous was "struggling" academically, and staff at Sonoda had been concerned after he became difficult to contact earlier in the year.

=== Cause of death ===
Pendrous' body was in an advanced state of decomposition when he was found, complicating efforts to identify him and establish the exact cause of death which remains unknown following the conclusion of the coroner's investigation. However, there is no evidence that drug use or self-harm was involved, or that Pendrous' body was moved, and the case was not treated as suspicious. In November 2019, Holland told media that he had been advised his son likely died of natural causes.

Forensic pathologist Dr Christopher Lawrence, who performed a full autopsy, stated there were no obvious injuries to Pendrous' body. However, Pendrous was found close to a heating unit which had been turned on to a high setting, and he was in possession of medicine for gastrointestinal discomfort. Lawrence noted this could indicate Pendrous had a fever and may have been unwell, but it would not be possible to assess if Pendrous had died as the result of an infection.

== Timeline of incident ==
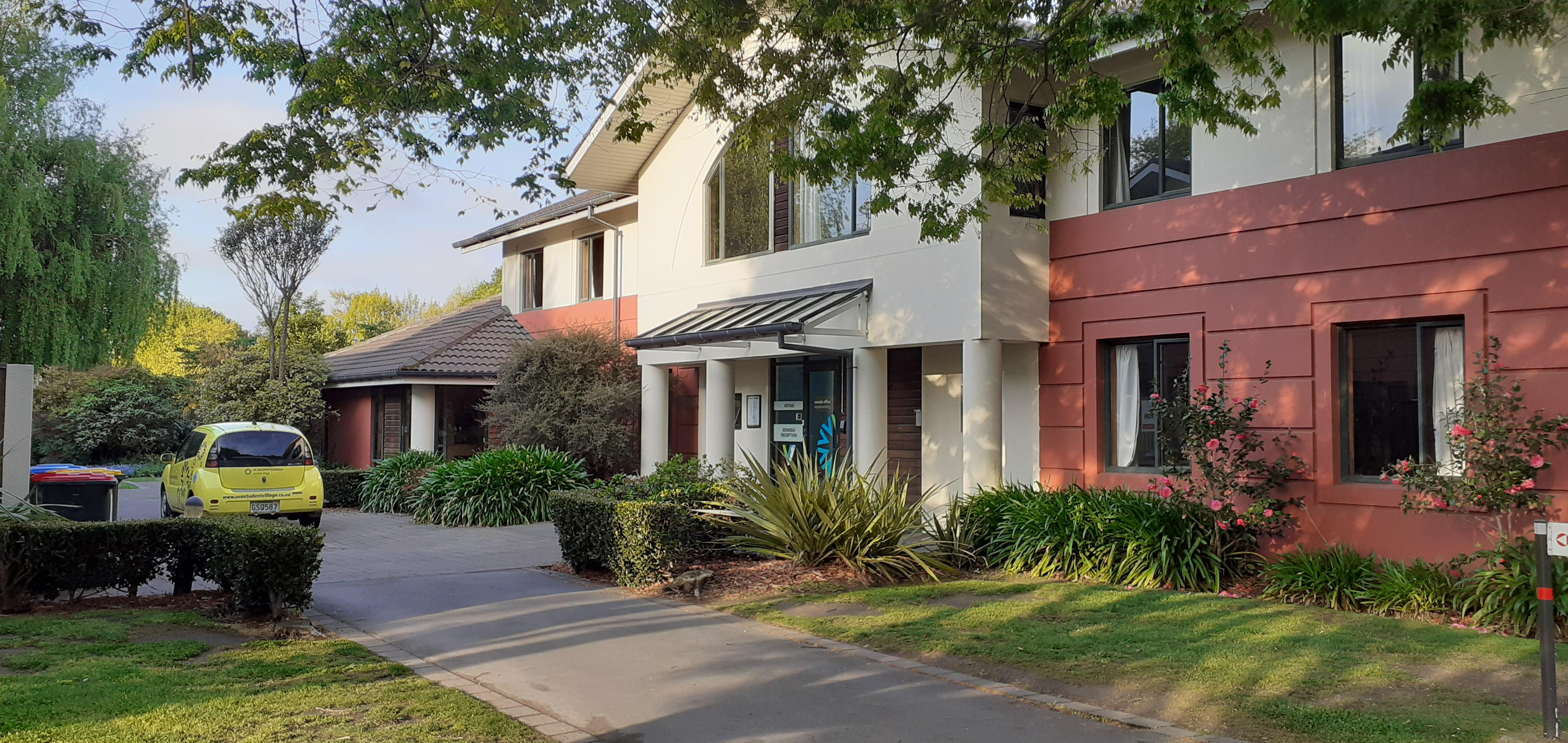
Sonoda hall, pictured in October 2019 three weeks after Pendrous was found, and where he spent his final days.

The exact circumstances leading up to Pendrous' death are unclear, due to his semi-seclusive behaviour, however it is alleged that concerns were raised as early as May 2019.

May

Campus Living Villages claims that during this period, Pendrous had been slow to collect a replacement access key card for the Sonoda complex he stayed at. Staff discuss the need to check on Pendrous regularly. It is unclear if this was followed up.

Friday, 21 June

Pendrous last bank transaction occurred on this day at a Countdown supermarket located on Church Corner, an area of Upper Riccarton.

Friday, 19 July

Holland speaks to Pendrous for the last time at approximately 11pm. Holland described him as sounding "very happy."

Monday, 12 August

Pendrous is photographically recorded leaving and entering the Hinoki building where he lived. This is the last time he is confirmed to have left the building.

Monday, 19 August

Holland had been unable to reach Pendrous despite sending him emails and text messages, but assumed it was due to his busy lifestyle. Around this time, Holland claims he attempted to contact Campus Living Villages.

Saturday, 24 August

At the beginning of the mid-semester break (a two-week break from lectures) Pendrous logs into university-provided Internet for the last time. He allegedly messaged online friends with whom he played multiplayer games with, joking about the results of a game they had played together. This is the last time Pendrous was heard from. After discovering Pendrous' phone number had been deactivated, Holland becomes suspicious and emails the University of Canterbury to enquire. He alleges that neither Campus Living Villages or the University of Canterbury were able to determine when they had last seen Pendrous.

Monday, 23 September

Pendrous' body is found at approximately 10:50pm by a Campus Living Villages duty manager. Other students claim they had noticed a strange smell in the complex in September. It is purported that alarm was raised when a student scaled the roof to peer into Pendrous' room, which was above ground level.

Pendrous' body was heavily decomposed. Police required assistance from the Disaster Identification Team which use specialist methods (typically fingerprints and dental records) to identify bodies. It was initially reported that Pendrous had been deceased for eight weeks, but this was later revised to approximately four.

== Reaction ==
Reaction to the death of Pendrous swiftly spread around New Zealand media and was picked up by a number of outlets for weeks following the initial story, broadly criticising the circumstances that allowed Pendrous to lay unnoticed for weeks after his death, and raising concerns about the quality of pastoral care provided by companies offering accommodation services. Student unions also demanded changes to better protect students.

In October, it was reported that fraudsters had created a fake fundraising campaign on the crowdfunding website GoGetFunding, using the memory of Pendrous to solicit donations. The page was taken down after several days.

=== Criticism of Campus Living Villages ===
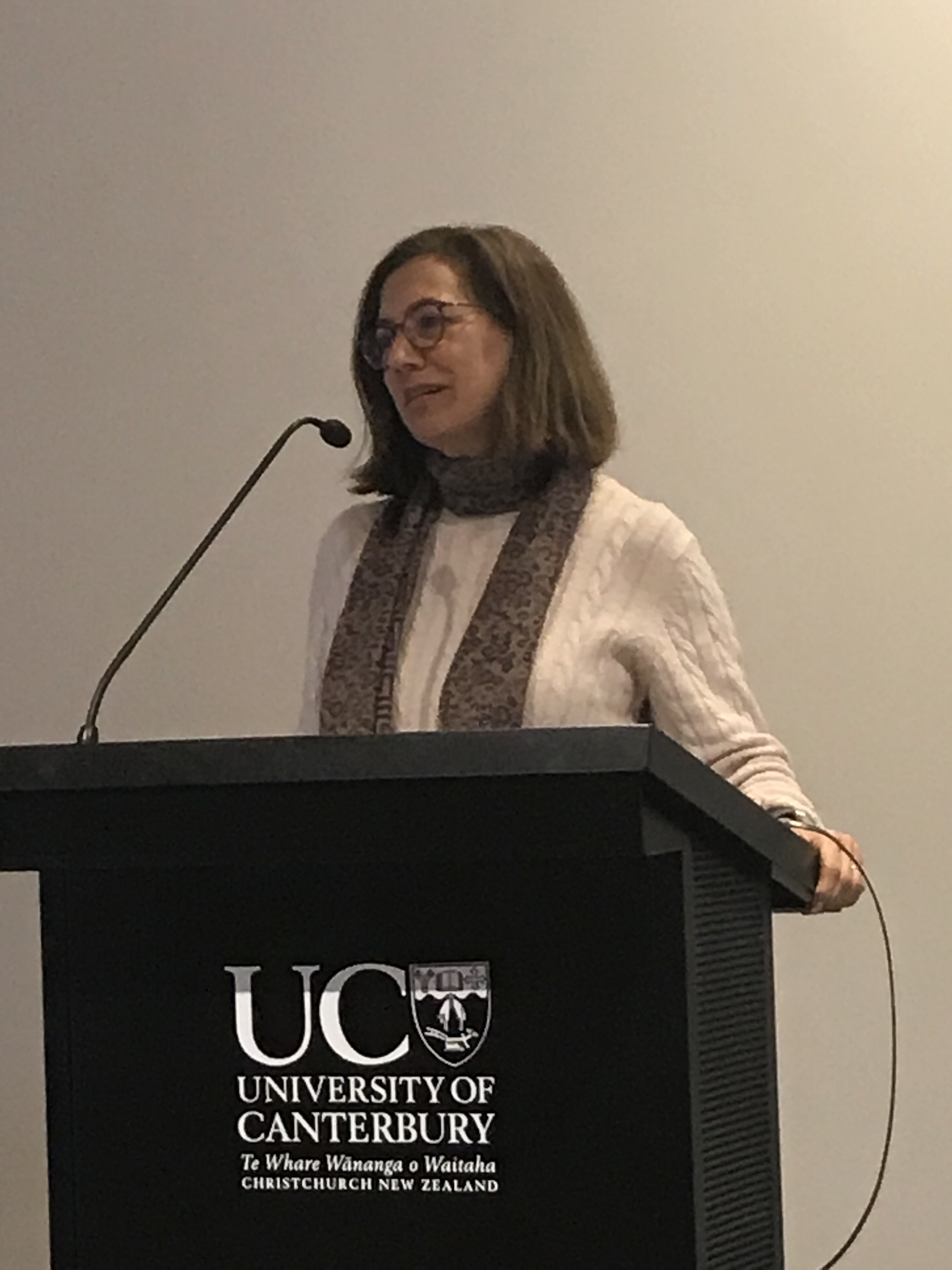
University of Canterbury vice-chancellor Cheryl de la Rey, pictured in 2019

Campus Living Villages, which is headquartered in Australia, came under scrutiny following Pendrous' death, in large due to the perception that the company had failed to provide the pastoral care it had promised. Former students who had stayed at Sonoda and other facilities owned by the company penned articles that were critical of the quality of care the company offered and alleged they were left unnoticed during their stay. One former residential assistant, who left the role in 2011, claimed that the company was intentionally under-staffing to cut costs, putting strain on staff and making it difficult for them to provide appropriate care, and ignoring their warnings. Holland also alleged that John Schroder, then the managing director of Campus Living Villages, had told him that there were twelve deaths across their global facilities in the last thirteen months. Schroder would later state that there had not been an incident (to his knowledge) where a student had died and gone unnoticed for an extended period of time.

Schroder held a press conference in response to Pendrous' death, announcing the company would begin its own investigation into how Pendrous went unnoticed for several weeks, and would consider changing how it operates. The Sonoda campus was removed from the company's website and the facility was made unavailable to first year students in 2020 following the incident.

Other New Zealand halls of residence operated by Campus Living Villages made adjustments to their processes, including Te Pa Taiura Student Village at the Otago Polytechnic.

=== University of Canterbury ===
Vice-Chancellor Cheryl de la Rey apologised to Pendrous' family and fronted press to address his death, stating "it is inconceivable to imagine how these circumstances could have occurred."

Following Pendrous’ death, questions were raised about the relationship the University of Canterbury has with Campus Living Villages to provide accommodation, which first signed its contract in 2005 and has renegotiated several times since. The university announced it would be starting its own investigation into the case but would not comment on if it was considering terminating its contract with Campus Living Villages. In January 2020, the university collaborated with Lincoln University to develop a "student health initiative" to further support student wellbeing.

In December 2019, following the conclusion of coroner, the University of Canterbury released a press statement stating it would implement a variety of new programmes to support first-year students during their transition to university life, as well as a system to allow staff to monitor student engagement and progress to help detect if students are struggling. The university also dropped their support for semi-independent accommodation packages for first-year students, and is requiring a 1:25 ratio of residential assistants to students at apartment-style facilities. The university formally reached out to Campus Living Villages on the issues.

=== Reviews by other universities ===
In response to Pendrous' death, other universities in New Zealand began reviewing their student accommodation services, including the Southern Institute of Technology. Tim Fowler, the chief executive of the Tertiary Education Commission, contacted every tertiary provider in New Zealand requesting they review the accommodation services provided to their students.

Ashley Day, the former head of several halls of residences for the University of Otago, publicly called for a compulsory ratio of 1:20 residential assistants to students. Day criticised the reduction in the number of residential assistants at student accommodation providers in New Zealand, as well as the increased responsibilities, stating "young people with no experience are being put in managerial positions."

Details also emerged about the unrelated death of a 30-year-old student at Victoria University of Wellington in 2018 following investigations into student accommodation, however the student was discovered shortly after death; the university was happy with its staff response. This case, in conjunction with Pendrous' death, prompted education minister Chris Hipkins to investigate regulatory rules for accommodation providers, which would lead to law reform.

== Investigations ==
The New Zealand Police and coroner conducted their own investigation into the death. It was treated as non-suspicious. The investigation focused mainly on the timeframe in which Pendrous died, and was dubbed Operation Hinoki. Coroner Sue Johnson concluded her investigation in December 2019, stating the exact cause of Pendrous' death was indeterminable due to the state of decomposition his body was found in. In 2021, Johnson made her final comments on the case, stating Pendrous likely died of "unascertained natural causes" such as a "sudden medical event or a more slowly developing illness." Johnson concluded that there was no evidence to show Pendrous' death was avoidable.

Both Campus Living Villages and the University of Canterbury announced their own internal investigations into the incident shortly after Pendrous' death. The latter was to be independently conducted over six weeks by former High Court judge Kit Toogood QC, however the release of the report was delayed twice; first until late November 2019, then again when Toogood stated the coroner's investigation "takes precedence."

=== Outcome of UC investigation ===
Toogood released the findings of his investigation in January 2020. The report concluded that the primary reason that Pendrous was not found in a timely manner was because of his preference to spend time alone in his room, such that students and CLV staff were not alarmed by his absence. However, the report also noted that Campus Living Villages failed to adequately follow-up with Pendrous after concerns were raised, a move Toogood labelled "inconsistent with accepted practice." The report also stated there was a shortage of staff at Sonoda and processes to monitor student welfare were loosely adhered to. Toogood made several recommendations in the report, including increasing minimum staffing numbers, introducing new processes to monitor student wellbeing, and restricting first year students from living at Sonoda.

An article published by Stuff claimed that a more robust 127-page report (intended to be confidential and allegedly withheld from media) stated that the University of Canterbury had disclosed student grades to the Campus Living Villages regional manager expecting students of concern to be checked upon. The company did not follow-up on this information for over a month despite being sent reminder emails. It is likely that Pendrous would have been found sooner had the information been acted upon. CLV claimed that historically staff would have followed-up in a matter of days.

In September 2021, Campus Living Villages sold its property assets in Christchurch to Cedar Pacific, who handed the operations to UniLodge. A CLV spokesperson confirmed the handover would be in effect by October that year.

== Government response ==
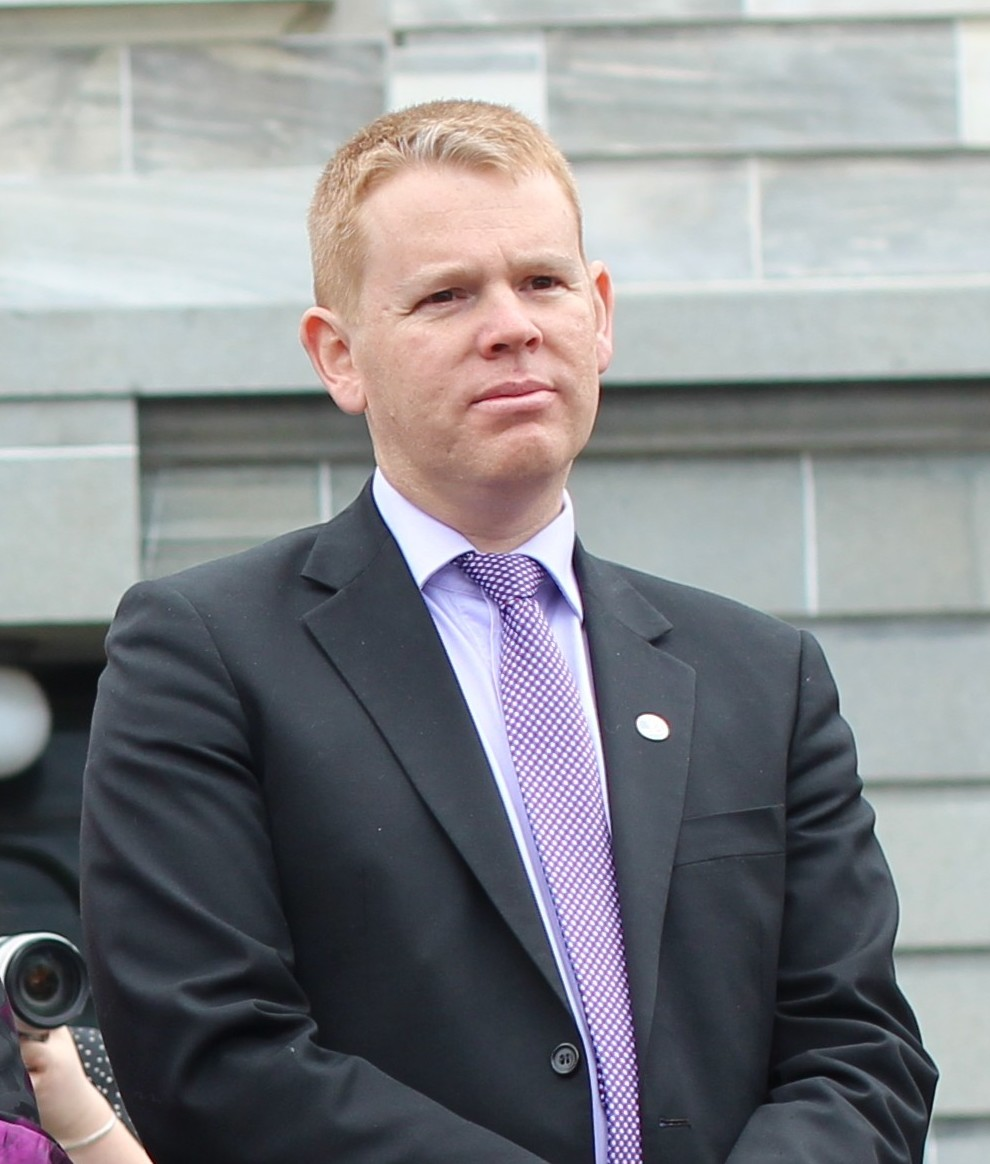
Hipkins pictured in 2018.

Following news of the death, the Education Minister Chris Hipkins released a statement: “My thoughts are with the family and friends of the victim. This must be an incredibly distressing time for them." He expressed his expectation that the university would investigate. Hipkins would later vow to look into reforming the law at the time, in which student accommodation codes were adopted on a voluntary basis by providers. This decision was prompted both by the Pendrous case and new details of a student death at the Victoria University of Wellington in 2018.

=== Changes to Education Act ===
On Monday 14 October, Hipkins announced an "urgent" law change in response to the death of Mason Pendrous, dubbed the Education (Pastoral Care) Amendment Bill. An interim code was developed and is to be put in effect for the start of the 2020 academic year, pending a permanent code for 2021 that would be mandatory for universities to adhere to. It is set to replace the existing voluntary code, making it an offence under the Education Act if a student is harmed as the result of a failure to provide adequate pastoral care. It is proposed institutions will be liable for fines of up to $100,000 (NZD). Holland reportedly said in a statement that he was "pleased and grateful" and described the governments reaction as "swift". The bill passed its first reading on 17 October, and received royal assent on 19 December.

Hipkins labelled the former voluntary code, as having failed to "maintain adequate standards of student wellbeing".

=== Response by Ardern ===
Following announcements of law change, Prime Minister Jacinda Ardern was questioned on the reforms, with allegations the response was a "knee-jerk reaction" to the Pendrous case. Ardern refused to comment specifically on Pendrous' death, instead stating she was waiting for the coroners investigation to conclude.
