= University of Houston student housing =

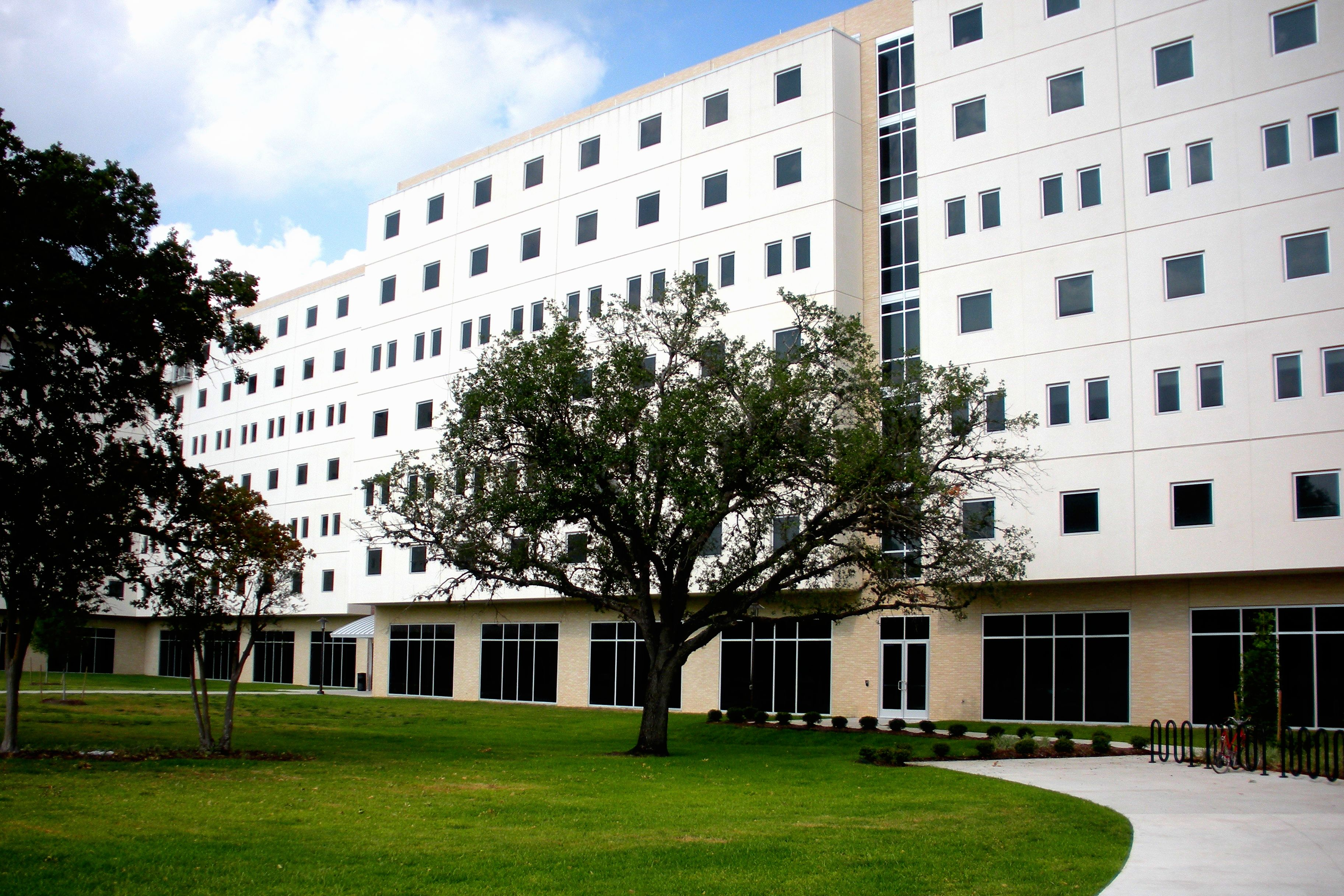
Cougar Village I

Fifteen percent of University of Houston students live on campus. UH has several on campus dormitories: Moody Towers, The Quad, Cougar Village I, Cougar Village II, Cougar Place, and University Lofts. UH also has partnerships with three private complexes, Bayou Oaks, Cullen Oaks, and Cambridge Oaks.

== University-operated housing ==
Moody Towers, frequently just called "Moody," is one of the tallest complexes on campus and the largest area of residence halls. Each of the two towers consists of eighteen stories and together house 1,100 students. The Towers feature a newly renovated state of the art dining hall. The rooms in The Towers were scheduled to be renovated during the summer of 2011. Moody Towers was slated to start deconstruction in 2020 in order to be replaced, however, the COVID-19 pandemic and student demand for keeping Moody (due to its lower price-point and general convenience) delayed this and Moody will remain open through the 2021-22 school year.

The Quadrangle, also known as "The Quad," is the oldest housing area on campus and consists of several coed dorm halls: Bates, Law, Oberholtzer, Settegast, and Taub. Oberholtzer Hall features a smaller, albeit cozy dining hall. The Quadrangle houses 800 students. The rooms in The Quad were scheduled to be renovated during the summer of 2011.

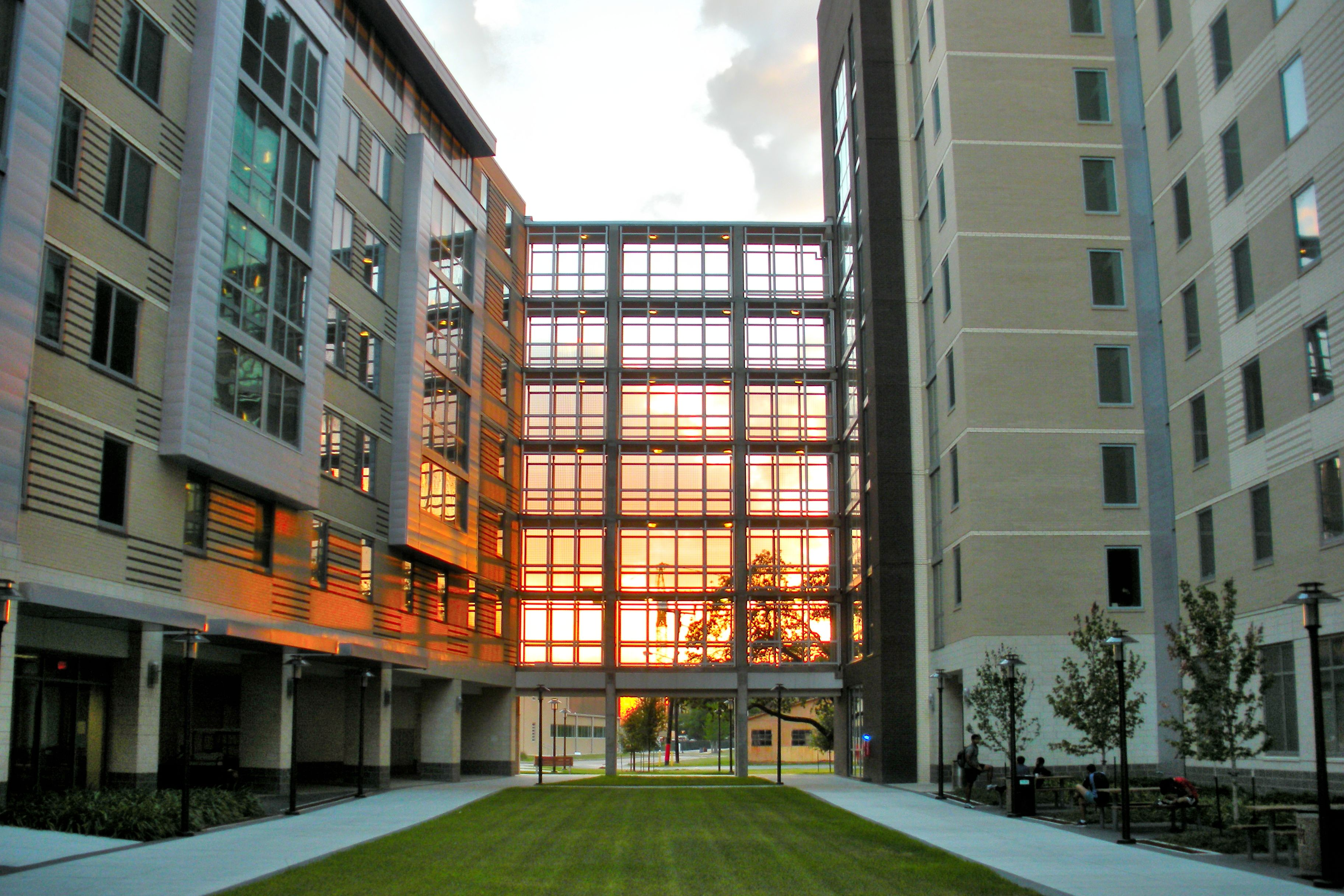
University Lofts

In 2020, completion of the replacement for The Quadrangle (now simply known as 'The Quad') was completed and the new dorm opened - its features and amenities are similar to that of Cougar Place, featuring suite-styled living spaces with an almost identical layout (including four private bedrooms with modern/upgraded amenities compared to its predecessor). It also features a large central-courtyard and is also right next to the Cougar Woods dining hall. It also features Townhouses that provide private, single bedrooms and community spaces (kitchen and living rooms) - however, these Townhouses are only available to those students who are a part of a Living Learning Community (LLC).

Cougar Village I is a freshman/Honors College dorm which opened in August 2010. The dormitory features themed floors with kitchens and lounges, a tutoring center, computer labs, multi-purpose rooms, study areas, a convenience store, a laundry facility, and a fitness center. Cougar Village I is exclusive only to freshman and Honor College students.

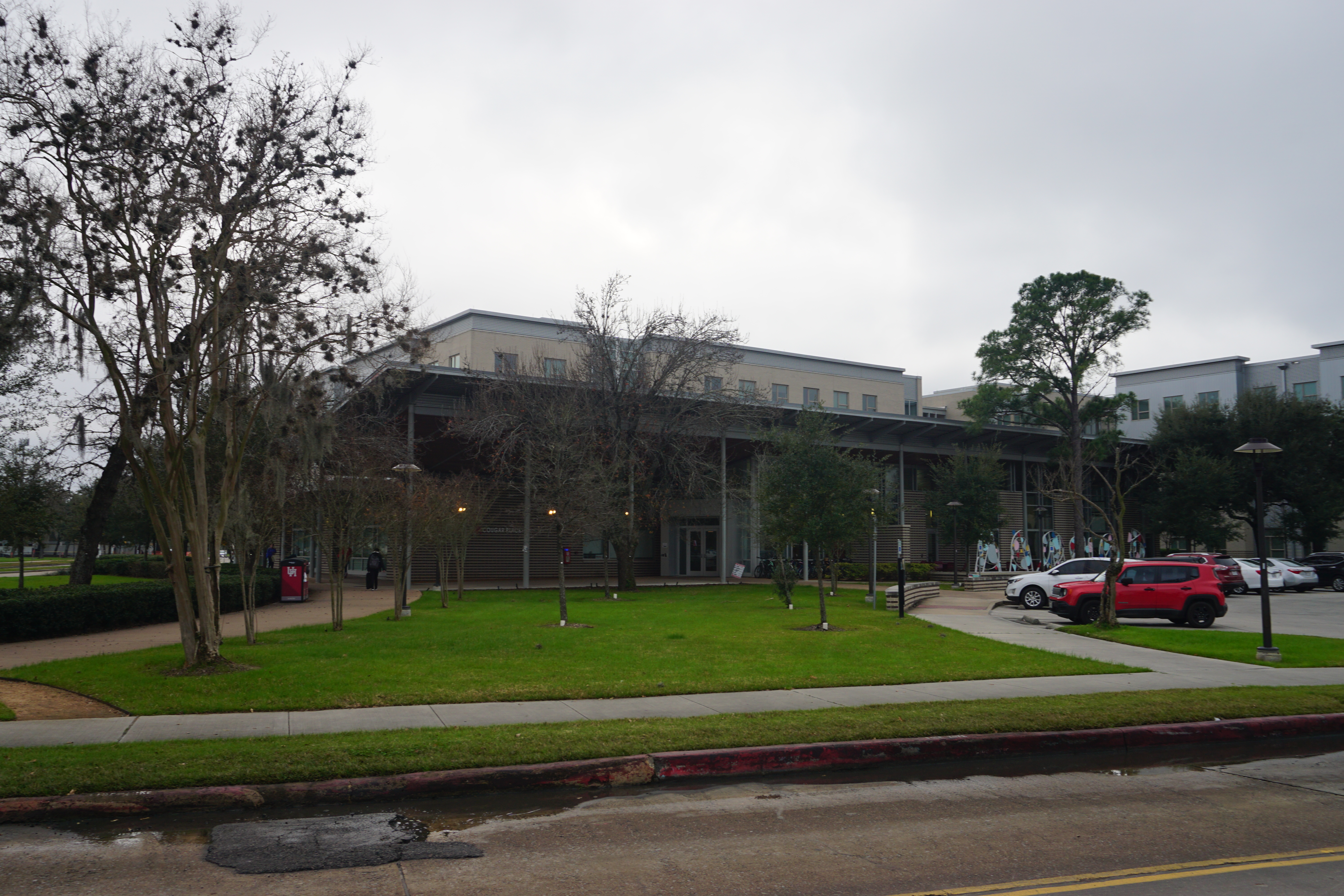
Cougar Place in 2019

In addition to Cougar Village I, the University of Houston has authorized the construction of a second freshman and honors only housing complex, Cougar Village II. Cougar Village II is slated for a Fall 2013 opening.

In conjunction with traditional dormitories, UH has an apartment-style dormitory called Cougar Place that is a housing area consisting of 400 units. Cougar Place will soon be removed during the summer of 2011 making way for a new dorm to replace it. The new dorm built after it, also named Cougar Place, features 800 bed spaces and is meant to house students who are Sophomores or higher. It features suite-styled living spaces with 4 private bedrooms (however, options for single or double-living spaces are also available) and has modern amenities compared to its predecessor.

In August 2009 University Lofts—a new university-owned and operated residential facility aimed at graduate and professional students—opened and includes retail stores, lecture halls, and recreation facilities.

In June 2017, a divided panel of the United States Court of Appeals for the Fifth Circuit found that the university did not violate the Constitution's Due Process Clause or Title IX when it expelled a student for committing a campus sexual assault in a dorm room then abandoning the nude victim in a dorm elevator, as well as his girlfriend, who had recorded the assault and shared the video on social media.

== Partnership housing ==
UH also has several privately owned apartment complexes on campus that are Cullen Oaks, Bayou Oaks, and Cambridge Oaks.

American Campus Communities owns and operates Bayou Oaks and Cullen Oaks.

Cambridge Oaks, the designated family housing complex for University of Houston students, opened in 1990. Campus Living Villages owns and operates the facility. It houses over 600 students from UH and other area institutions. The complex has 210 units. Century Development had developed Cambridge Oaks. Students from the University of Houston, the University of Houston–Downtown, Texas Southern University, and Houston Community College are eligible to live in Cambridge Oaks.

Cambridge Oaks is served by the Houston Independent School District. The zoned schools are Lockhart Elementary School, Cullen Middle School, and Yates High School. Previously it was served by Ryan Middle School.
