= CLV =

CLV may refer to:

- Caldas Novas Airport (IATA code), Brazil
- Campaign for Labour Victory, an organization of the British Labour Party in the late 1970s
- Campus Living Villages, a university student housing development company headquartered in Sydney, Australia
- City of Las Vegas, the most populous city in the U.S. state of Nevada
- Cleveland (county), former ceremonial county in England, Chapman code
- Cleveland Spiders (1887–1899), a former Major League Baseball team from Cleveland, Ohio
- Concordant Literal Version, an English translation of the Bible
- Concordia Language Villages, a world-language and culture education program
- Constant linear velocity, a qualifier for the rated speed of an optical disc drive
- Cramlington Learning Village, a high school in Cramlington, Northumberland, England
- Crew Launch Vehicle, a human-crew launch vehicle being developed by NASA for future use
- Customer lifetime value, a prediction of the net profit attributed to the entire future relationship with a customer

== See also ==
- 155 (number), in Roman numerals
