= The Academy, Selsey =

Location
- School Lane; Selsey, West Sussex, PO20 9EH; England
- Coordinates: 50.7360°N 0.7913°W

Information
- Type: Academy
- Motto: Pride in Excellence
- Local authority: West Sussex County Council
- Trust: The Kemnal Academies Trust (TKAT)
- Department for Education URN: 137096 Tables
- Ofsted: Reports
- Chair of Governors: Simon Foster
- Headteacher: Jo Ford
- Gender: Mixed
- Age: 11 to 16
- Enrolment: 505
- Capacity: 600
- Houses: 4
- Colours: Blue; Red; Green; Yellow
- Website: www.theacademyselsey-tkat.org

The Academy Selsey, formerly the Manhood Community College and the Manhood Secondary Modern School, is a small co-educational non-selective academy for 11 to 16-year-old children, in the town of Selsey, on the Manhood Peninsula, just south of Chichester, West Sussex It is part of The Kemnal Academies Trust; the multi-academy trust that oversees a number of secondary and primary schools in Kent and the south-east of England.

== History ==
The school was opened by the Duke of Norfolk in September 1963, and was once the second smallest high school in West Sussex. It caters for up to 600 pupils in Years 7 to 11. It became an academy on 1 September 2011, and a part of The Kemnal Academies Trust.

On 21 August 2016 a fire broke out at the academy causing extensive damage. The blaze was tackled by firefighters from Hampshire, East Sussex and Surrey. At its height 14 fire engines, 2 aerial ladder platforms and support vehicles were deployed. The roofspace blaze affected 75% of the building, particularly the central and technology areas. Selsey Library, which sits alongside the academy, was unaffected.

== Buildings ==
The main building dated from the early 1960s and new drama and music facilities were added in 2004, a new sports hall in 2008 and a new library in September 2012. The fire that was believed to have started in the roof space when the building was closed during the summer break, devastated most of the building. The library block was saved. In the immediate aftermath younger student were taught in Selsey Town Hall, and older pupils at the leisure centre and Bunn leisure. By autumn a temporary teaching block had been erected. On 15 May 2019, the new permanent building was opened.

== Academics ==
The school is a small rural comprehensive. Ofsted described this as a "good" school in 2019.

All students, whether in Key Stage 3 or Key Stage 4 are expected to study a core curriculum of Maths, Science, English for 18 hrs a fortnight, and do two or three hours of PE. Key Stage 3 students, that is years 7, 8 and 9 will do a cocktail of Spanish, Humanities, Drama, Music, Art, ICT, and Catering.

In Key Stage 4 are allowed to choose four subject as options. These are presented in option columns and allow triple science GCSE, some BTEC Level 2 subject and the GCSE subjects needed for an EBacc. Options are each studied for five hours a fortnight.
