= Chichester High School =

Location
- Kingsham Road; Chichester, West Sussex, PO19 8EB; England; 50°49′51″N 0°46′35″W

Information
- Other name: CHS
- Type: Academy
- Motto: Enjoy Endeavour Excel
- Established: September 2016
- Local authority: West Sussex County Council
- Trust: The Kemnal Academies Trust
- Department for Education URN: 140105 Tables
- Ofsted: Reports
- Head teacher: Naomi Lewry and Nicholas Taylor
- Gender: Mixed
- Age range: 11–18
- Enrolment: 1,373 (2020)
- Capacity: 1,600
- Colour: Purple
- Website: www.chs-tkat.org

Chichester High School (CHS) is an 11–18 mixed secondary school and sixth form with academy status in Chichester, West Sussex, England. It was established in September 2016 following the merger of Chichester High School for Boys and Chichester High School for Girls. It is part of The Kemnal Academies Trust.

== History ==
=== Chichester High School for Girls ===
The Chichester High School for Girls was established in 1910. It merged with the Lancastrian School for Girls in 1972. Lancastrian Schools were founded in Chichester by Joseph Lancaster 1811/1812.

The school held dual specialist Science College and Arts College status before converting to academy status in September 2013, when the number of students on roll was 1,463 including more than 400 students in the sixth form, which was already fully integrated with Chichester High School for Boys.

The South Downs Planetarium, which is situated at the back of the site, opened in April 2002.

== The site ==
The school's campus was originally in the Stockbridge area of Chichester. Buildings were then built in Kingsham Road, next to Chichester High School for Boys and the school was split between the two sites for a few years until a large-scale building project at Kingsham was completed and the school could fully relocate there.

== Facilities ==
Recently, the school has carried out a considerable building programme including: a purpose-built building for languages, English, science and design technology, a new Learning Resources Centre, a new administrative and reception area with a wireless network. The synthetic Astroturf pitch has been refurbished. The sixth form centre has been extended to accommodate an increased number of sixth formers. A new sports hall has recently been completed. The South Downs Planetarium, supported by Sir Patrick Moore, a local resident, opened on the site on 5 April 2002.

== Sports ==
The school has extensive sporting facilities, including an international-standard irrigated all-weather hockey pitch, a large sports hall, tennis courts, a gym hall, a dance studio, and extensive grounds for a whole range of competitive sports, such as netball, hockey, rugby, football, tennis, squash, athletics, and badminton. A separate sports centre was completed in 2009, providing students with modern sports facilities.
