= James Meaker =

Irish flying ace of WWII (1919-1940)

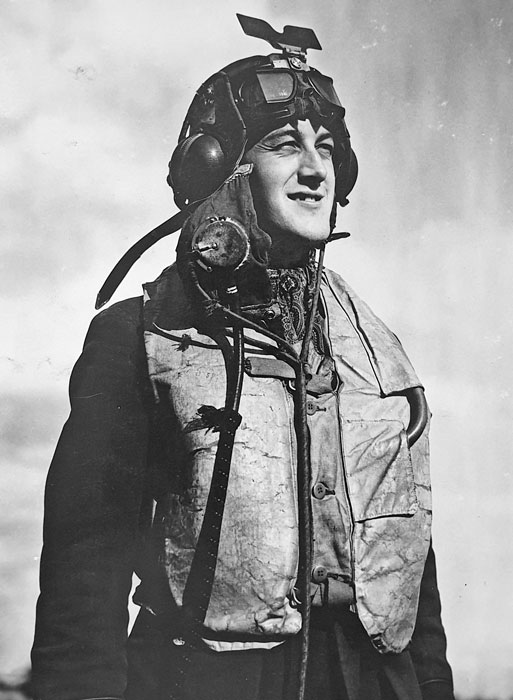
- An official photograph of Meaker, captioned "A typical pilot of a Fighter Squadron"
- Born: 19 January 1919; Kinsale, County Cork, Ireland
- Died: 27 September 1940 (aged 21) †; Warren Field, Brightling Park, England
- Burial place: West Dean Cemetery, West Dean, West Sussex, England
- Military career
- Allegiance: United Kingdom
- Branch: Royal Air Force
- Rank: Pilot Officer
- Units: No. 263 Squadron; No. 249 Squadron
- Conflicts: Second World War: Norwegian campaign; Battle of Britain
- Awards: Distinguished Flying Cross

James Meaker DFC (19 January 1919 – 27 September 1940) was an Irish-born flying ace of the Royal Air Force (RAF) during the Second World War and the postwar period. He is credited with the destruction of at least nine aircraft.

From Kinsale, Meaker joined the RAF in June 1939 and once his training was completed, he was posted to No. 46 Squadron. He was subsequently transferred to No. 263 Squadron and flew Gloster Gladiator fighters during the campaign in Norway. Afterwards he was posted to No. 249 Squadron and flew with this unit during the Battle of Britain, shooting down several German aircraft. Killed in action on 27 September 1940, aged 21, he was posthumously awarded the Distinguished Flying Cross.

== Early life ==
James Reginald Bryan Meaker was born on 19 January 1919 in Kinsale, County CorkIreland. His parents were from Sussex, his father serving in Ireland as an officer in the British Army's Royal Fusiliers. Meaker went to Chichester High School and once his education was completed, found employment as a reporter at the Chichester Observer. In June 1939, he joined the Royal Air Force (RAF) on a short service commission. Meaker commenced training at No. 6 Elementary & Reserve Flying Training School at Sywell Aerodrome and then proceeded to No. 12 Flying Training School at Grantham. He was commissioned as an acting pilot officer on 19 August.

== Second World War ==
Commencing training on the Hawker Hurricane fighter at Aston Down in February 1940, Meaker was confirmed in his pilot officer rank the same month. In late March he was posted to No. 46 Squadron at Digby but shortly afterwards was assigned to No. 27 Maintenance Unit RAF as a staff pilot. In early May he was transferred to No. 263 Squadron. His new unit was based at Scapa Flow, having been involved with its Gloster Gladiator fighters in the early stages of the Norwegian campaign, and was in the process of preparing for a return to that country. Transported to Norway on the aircraft carrier HMS Glorious, the squadron carried out patrolling duties from 21 May to 7 June. Meaker returned to the United Kingdom separately from the majority of the squadron, which embarked on the Glorious. He thus avoided being caught up in the sinking of the aircraft carrier on 8 June, which saw the death of most of the squadron's flying personnel.

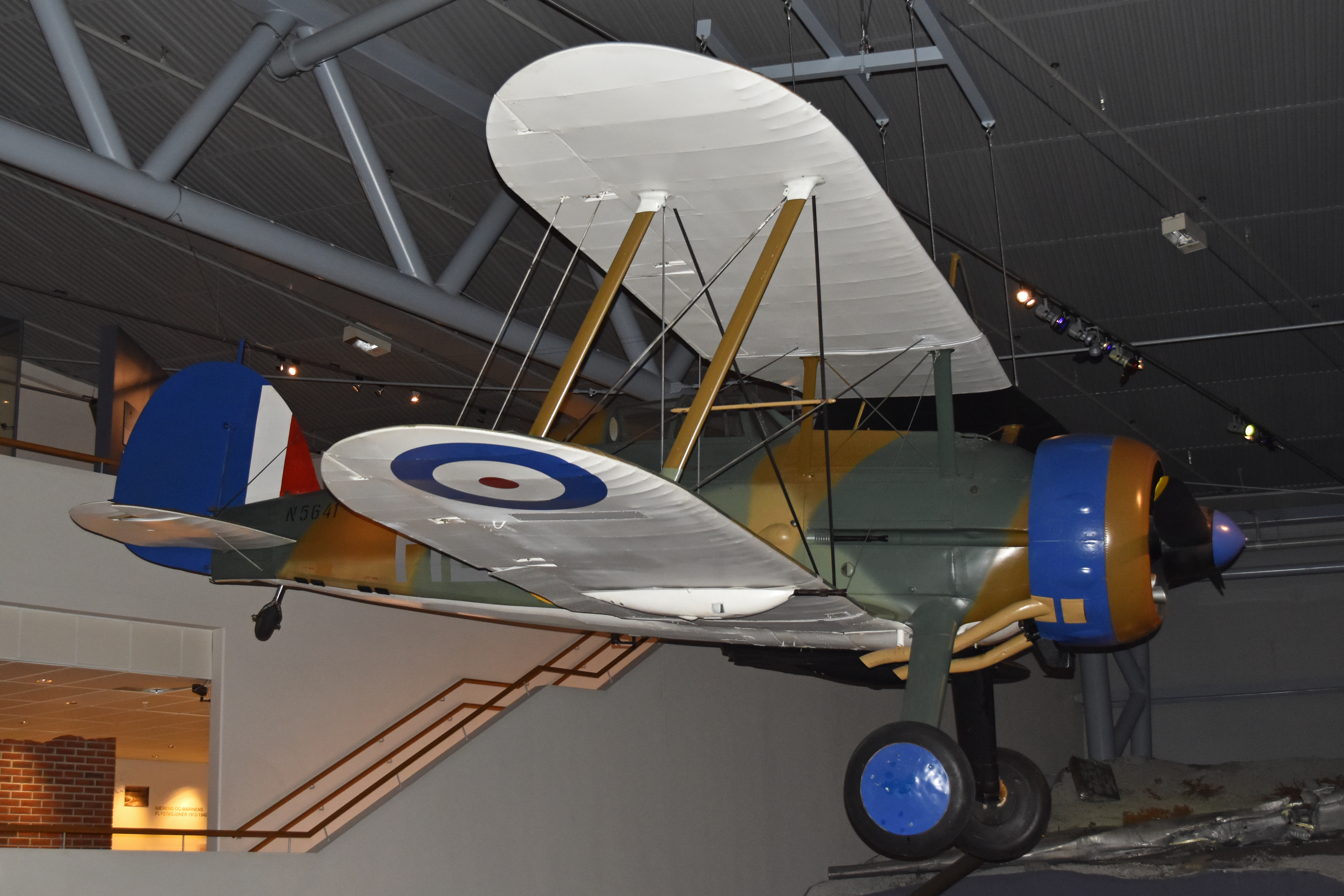
A restored Gloster Gladiator of No. 263 Squadron at the Norwegian Aviation Museum

=== Battle of Britain ===
Meaker was posted to No. 249 Squadron in late June. This was based at Leconfield and was operating the Hurricane as it worked up to operational status, which was achieved in early July. It was moved to Church Fenton and then Boscombe Down, becoming involved in the aerial campaign over southeast England. Meaker achieved his first aerial victory on 15 August when he shot down a Messerschmitt Bf 110 heavy fighter near Ringwood. A Messerschmitt Bf 109 fighter was destroyed by Meaker to the south of the Isle of Wight on 24 August. He damaged a Dornier Do 17 medium bomber near Canterbury and shared in the destruction of a second over Rochford on 2 September. He also destroyed a Bf 110 near Gravesend the same day. On 6 September, No. 249 Squadron was scrambled to intercept a bomber raid and engaged the German formation over the Thames estuary. Meaker shot down a pair of Bf 109s, reporting both as being set alight as a result of his gunfire.

On 15 September, what is now known as Battle of Britain Day, Meaker destroyed two Do 17s, near Chatham and London respectively, shared in the probable destruction of a Do 17 and damaged a Bf 109, also near London. On 27 September, he and another pilot shared in the shooting down of a Bf 110 near Redhill. He subsequently engaged a Junkers Ju 88 medium bomber but his Hurricane was damaged by machine gun fire from his target. He bailed out of his stricken aircraft but appears to have been injured and never opened his parachute. He landed at Warren Field, Brightling Park.

Meaker was posthumously awarded the Distinguished Flying Cross (DFC) on 8 October, the medal being subsequently presented to his parents by King George VI at an investiture at Buckingham Palace. The citation for his DFC, published in The London Gazette, read:

Pilot Officer Meaker has shot down at least five enemy aircraft and damaged others. Resolute in attack, with a calm, determined temperament, his leadership has been an example to his squadron.

— London Gazette, No. 34964, 8 October 1940

Buried at West Dean Cemetery in West Dean, West Sussex, Meaker is credited with having destroyed nine German aircraft, two of which were shared with other pilots. He also shared in the probable destruction of one aircraft and damaged two more. His diaries were presented to the Air Ministry by his parents, and extracts from these were later published in British newspapers. A memorial to Meaker was unveiled at Brightling Park on the 50th anniversary of his death.
