= Martin Hall (archaeologist) =

British-South African academic and educationalist

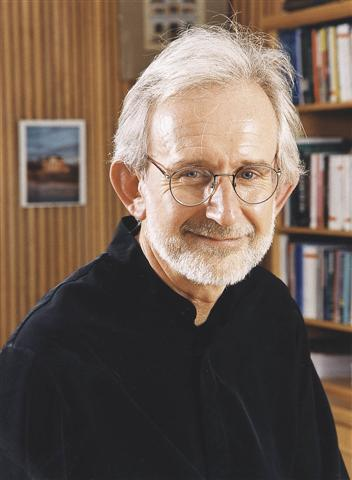
- Hall in 2003
- Born: Guildford, England
- Education: Cambridge University
- Spouse: Brenda Cooper
- Scientific career
- Fields: Archaeology, anthropology
- Workplaces: University of Cape Town, University of Salford
- Website: martinhallfacilitation.org

Martin Hall (born in Guildford, England) is a British-South African academic and educationalist who has written extensively on South African history, culture and higher education policy. He is a former Vice Chancellor of the University of Salford and is currently serving as the acting Deputy Vice-Chancellor (DVC): Transformation at the University of Cape Town.

== Early life ==
Hall studied at Chichester High School For Boys, one of the two state schools in the United Kingdom at the time that prepared students for Oxbridge admission. He was the first in his family to complete university. He completed his bachelor's degree in archaeology and anthropology at Cambridge University in 1974.

== Early career ==
He worked firstly in Lesotho in the area of archaeological excavation and then in London for the Southwark Archaeological Rescue Unit. He moved to South Africa in 1975 where he worked for five years as an ethnoarchaeologist in the Natal Museum in Pietermaritzburg. He completed his doctoral studies at Cambridge in 1980 and moved to Cape Town in the same year. He then became Chief Professional Officer for the Department of Archaeology at the South African Museum.

== University of Cape Town ==
He joined the University of Cape Town Department of Archaeology in 1983 and was promoted from Associate Professor to Professor of Historical Archaeology, becoming in due course the head of department. In 1983 he became Director of the Centre for African Studies

He was Director of the Multimedia Education Group from 1997–2001 at UCT.

In 1998, he was appointed as a Fellow of the University of Cape Town, and the following year became the inaugural Dean of the Higher Education Development Unit, charged with coordinating support for students from underprivileged backgrounds.

In 1999, he was appointed as President of the World Archaeological Congress and also served as General Secretary of the South African Archaeological Society.

In 2002, he was promoted to deputy vice-chancellor and held this position for six years with responsibilities for strategic, academic and budget planning. He stepped down from this position at the end of August 2008 to take up a position at the Graduate School of Business.

He is a fellow of the Royal Society of South Africa.

He is part of Flooved advisory board.

He was appointed as the acting Deputy Vice-Chancellor (DVC): Transformation at the University of Cape Town after Loretta Ferris decided not to stand for another term.

== University of Salford ==
Short-listed for the position of Chancellor at the University of Massachusetts Ahmherst, Hall was however unsuccessful. He was to be appointed a few months later, in October 2008, as the next vice-chancellor. He arrived at Salford in April 2009 as vice-chancellor designate and officially took up the post on 1 August 2009. Hall stated in June 2013 that Salford had had "too aggressive an industrial-relations stance in previous years."

== Personal life ==
Hall holds joint British and South African citizenship. His wife, Professor Brenda Cooper, is an academic specialising in post-colonial and African literature. They have three children.

== Publications ==
- Hall, Martin 2000. "Archaeology and the Modern World: Colonial Transcripts in South Africa and the Chesapeake“ London: Routledge ISBN 0-415-22966-9
- Hall, Martin 2009. "Nothing is different but everything’s changed". In The Next Twenty Five Years? Affirmative Action and Higher Education in the United States and South Africa.
- Edited by Martin Hall, Marvin Krislov and David L. Featherman. University of Michigan Press.
- Hall, Martin 2009. "New knowledge and the university". Anthropology Southern Africa, 32 (1 and 2): 69–86.
- Hall, Martin. 1987. Farmers, Kings, and Traders: The People of Southern Africa, 200-1860. Chicago: University of Chicago Press.

Academic offices
| Preceded by Michael Harloe | Vice-Chancellor of the University of Salford; 2009–2015 | Succeeded by Helen Marshall |
