= Moody Towers =

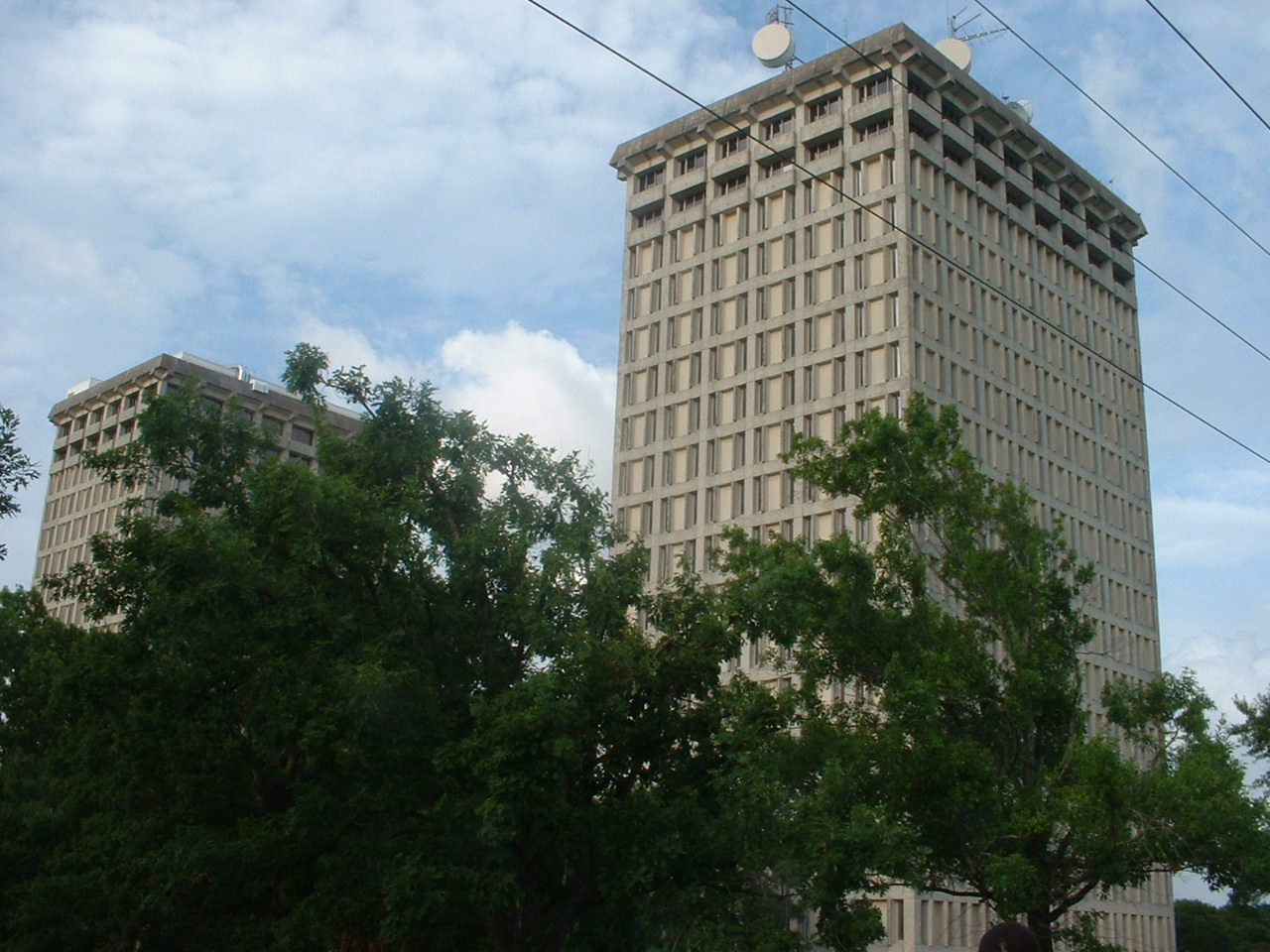
- Interactive map of the Moody Towers area
- Alternative names: Libbie Shearn Moody Tower; William Lewis Moody, Jr. Tower

General information
- Type: High-rise, residential
- Architectural style: Modernist
- Location: 4401 Wheeler Street; Houston, Texas, USA 77004
- Coordinates: 29.7173°N 95.3416°W
- Opened: 1970
- Cost: $10.4 million
- Owner: University of Houston

Height
- Height: 239.96 ft (73.14 m)

Technical details
- Floor count: 18

Design and construction
- Architects: Pitts, Phelps, & White

Website
- http://www.uh.edu/housing/housing-options/moody-towers/

Moody Towers are twin 18-story high-rise residence halls located in the Wheeler District on the campus of the University of Houston in Houston, Texas, United States. It was named for William Lewis Moody, Jr. and his wife Libbie Shearn Moody of Galveston, Texas, and houses 1,100 students. The towers also house the largest dining hall on the campus.

A mass shooting from atop Moody Towers was prevented when police arrested Albert J. Russell, Jr. in 1972. Russell, who was not a student, was trespassing on university property around the sixth anniversary of the mass shootings at the University of Texas at Austin, and attempted to go atop one of the towers with a loaded M14 rifle and a loaded .22 Long Rifle. Upon arrest, he told police he would've shot people had he been allowed on the rooftop.

== See also ==
- University of Houston student housing
