= Welling School =

Location
- Elsa Road; Welling, Greater London, DA16 1LB; England
- 51°28′06″N 0°06′49″E

Information
- Type: Academy
- Trust: The Kemnal Academies Trust
- Specialist: Arts (visual arts)
- Department for Education URN: 136720 Tables
- Ofsted: Reports
- Headteacher: D Hatley
- Gender: Mixed
- Age: 11 to 18
- Website: http://www.wellingschool-tkat.org/

Welling School is a mixed secondary school and sixth form located in the Welling area of the London Borough of Bexley, England.

== History ==
The school was completely redesigned and rebuilt in 2005 and became an academy in February 2012. It joined The Kemnal Academies Trust. Previously, Welling was a community school under the direct control of Bexley London Borough Council. The school continues to coordinate with Bexley London Borough Council for admissions.

== Description ==
Welling School is a much larger than average-sized 11–18 secondary school. The proportion of pupils from minority ethnic groups and who speak English as an additional language is below the national average. The proportion of pupils who are entitled to free schools meals is above the national average while the proportion of pupils who have special educational needs and/or disabilities, is twice the national average. The school has a significant number of in-year admissions, and 25% of the 2017 Year 11 cohort did not start their secondary education at the school in Year 7. Attainment on entry from primary school is significantly below the national average.

== Buildings ==
The building date from 2005, when the school had a Visual Arts specialism. There is a sports hall and all-weather sports pitch. There are a range of performance spaces and studios, dance studio, and drama studio. There are specialist classrooms; Apple Mac computer rooms, recording studio, art gallery, library and a designated 6th Form Centre.

== Academics ==
Virtually all maintained schools and academies follow the National Curriculum, and are inspected by Ofsted on how well they succeed in delivering a 'broad and balanced curriculum'.

The school operates a three-year, Key Stage 3 where all the core National Curriculum subjects are taught. Year 7 and Year 8 study core subjects: English, Maths, Science (Biology, Chemistry & Physics), Geography, History and Modern Foreign Languages. The following foundation subjects are offered: Art, Art History, Computing, Design & Technology, Drama, Ethics & Life Skills PSHE & RE, French, Spanish, Music and PE.

For Key Stage 4l, students start their GCSE studies at the beginning of Year 10. They follow a set of core courses: English Language, English Literature, Mathematics, Science and in all study will study a minimum of eight Level 2 qualifications including GCSEs and vocational style courses. Students are guided onto their most appropriate pathway and study four optional courses. Within the combination of subjects available students will have the chance to study for an English Baccalaureate(EBACC) qualification with its Humanities and MFL requirement, or within a visual arts pathway, or performing arts or sports, where BTECs are available All students must do Core PE and PSRE.

There is a collaborative sixth-form where students will study some subjects at Trinity School, Belvedere.

== Welling Visual Arts ==
The school specialises in the visual arts, and has dedicated facilities to support the specialism for the use of pupils and the local community. The provision is known as Welling Visual Arts and includes The m3 Gallery which mainly displays pupils work, and Berwick Road Gallery which displays works by established artists such as David Hockney, Francisco Goya and Walker Evans.

=== alTURNERtive Prize ===
Welling Visual Arts also organises the alTURNERtive Prize, an exhibition which encourages pupils from Welling School to engage with independent practice and is timed to coincide with the Turner Prize at the Tate. The prize was established in 2002 by Henry Ward, and has been judged by critics such as Michael Archer (who judged the Turner Prize the year Keith Tyson won) and has been presented by Lucy Davis, Richard Wentworth, Hew Locke and Ryan Gander.
