= Tom Husband =

Scottish engineer (1936–2023)

Thomas Mutrie Husband FREng (7 July 1936 – 17 August 2023) was a Scottish engineer, and was the Vice-Chancellor of the University of Salford from 1990 to 1997.

== Life and career ==
Thomas Mutrie Husband was born in Glasgow on 7 July 1936. He was educated at Shawlands Academy, then went straight from school to a 5-year trade apprenticeship as a marine engine fitter at the Weir Group in Cathcart, Glasgow. On completion and with a Higher National Certificate he was sponsored by Weir to take a sandwich-structured BSc degree in Mechanical Engineering at Strathclyde University. He worked as a manager and project engineer at Weir having graduated in 1961. He left Glasgow to join the multi-national Swedish engineering group ASEA (now ABB) and worked with them in Denmark, Sweden and South Africa. In 1965 he came back to take an MA degree at Strathclyde in Management, then won a UK Government Fellowship to study Management on a 1-year tenure at the University of Chicago.

Husband was then appointed to a Lectureship in Engineering Management at Strathclyde (1967–70), where he also graduated with a PhD degree, before becoming Senior Lecturer and Head of Department of Production Management at the University of Glasgow (1970–73). In 1973 he was appointed Professor of Manufacturing Organisation at Loughborough University. He was next appointed, in 1981, to be Professor of Engineering Manufacture at Imperial College London, and was head of the Department of Mechanical Engineering at Imperial from 1983 to 1990. He also established the Centre for Robotics and Automated Systems at Imperial and was its Director from 1982 to 1990. He was elected as a Fellow of the Royal Academy of Engineering in 1988. He moved to the University of Salford in 1990, serving as Vice-Chancellor until 1997.

During his tenure at Salford he was a Director at the Manchester Royal Exchange Theatre, a Council Member of the Engineering Council, a member of the Manchester Steering Group for the Commonwealth Games and a Trustee of the Granada Foundation. He was awarded an honorary doctorate by the University of Manchester in 1990.

After his retirement from Salford he took on a range of roles including Chairman of the East and North Hertfordshire NHS Trust, Chairman of UKERNA, an expert adviser to the Swedish Government on their Nutek Programme and membership of the Governing Body of Bournemouth University.

Tom Husband died in Dorset on 17 August 2023, at the age of 87.
