= The Kemnal Academies Trust =

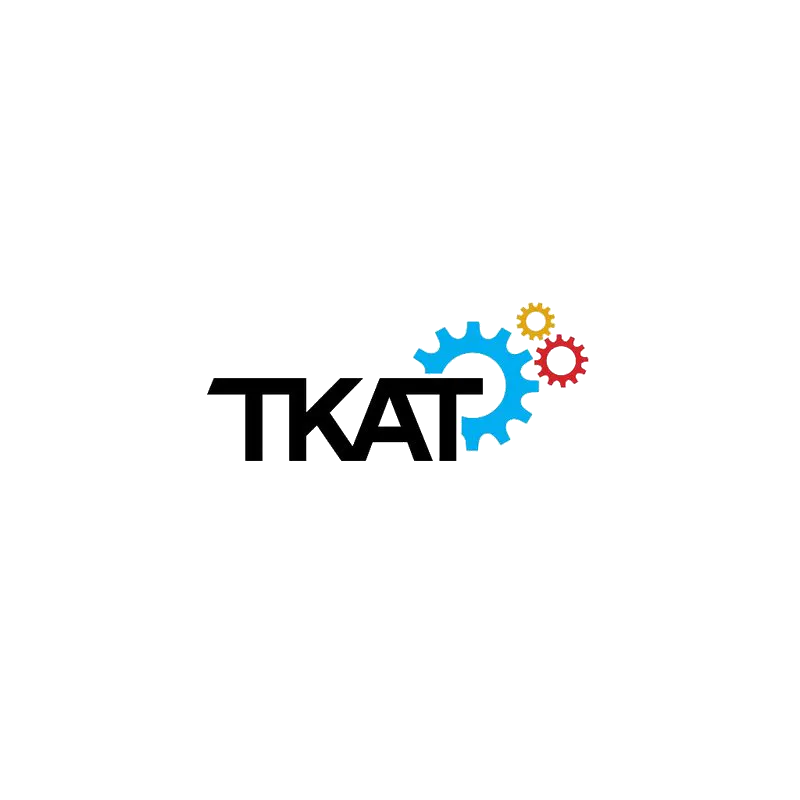
- Official Kemnal Academies Trust Logo
- Founded: 17 August 2010
- Founder: John Atkins CBE
- Type: Multi-academy Trust
- Registration no.: Private Limited Company 07348231
- Headquarters: Bexley, London Borough
- Chair of Trustees: Gaenor Bagley
- Chief Executive: Dr Karen Roberts
- Main organ: Board of Trustees
- Revenue: £164m
- Staff: 3,274
- Website: https://www.tkat.org/

The Kemnal Academies Trust (TKAT) is a multi-academy trust in England, with 45 Primary and Secondary Academies in its portfolio. It was founded by John Atkins CBE in August 2010.

TKAT's headquarters are in Sidcup, The London Borough of Bexley. TKAT had a turnover of £161.64m in the financial year ending 31 August 2022, had 3,274 employees, and had total assets of £281.54m.

== Academies ==
=== Secondary ===
- Havant Academy
- Kemnal Technology College
- Orchards Academy
- The Academy, Selsey
- King Harold Business & Enterprise Academy
- Rainham School for Girls
- Debden Park High School
- Hylands School
- Miltoncross Academy
- Cleeve Park School
- Shenstone School
- Welling School
- Bridgemary School
- Chichester High School
- Thomas Bennett Community College

=== Primary ===
- Ore Village Primary Academy
- Cleeve Meadow School
- Pebsham Primary Academy
- Heybridge Primary School
- Maldon Primary School
- Stapleford Abbotts
- Willow Brook Primary School and Nursery
- Front Lawn Primary Academy
- Dame Janet Primary Academy
- Drapers Mills Primary Academy
- East Wickham Primary Academy
- Gray's Farm Primary Academy
- Horizon Primary Academy
- Napier Community Primary and Nursery Academy
- Newlands Primary School
- Northdown Primary School
- Pluckley C of E Primary School
- Royal Park Primary Academy
- Salmestone Primary School
- Smarden Primary School
- Weyfield Primary Academy
- Broadfield Primary Academy
- Hilltop Primary School
- Portfield Primary Academy
- Seal Primary Academy
- Seymour Primary School
- Tangmere Primary Academy
- The Bewbush Academy
- The Mill Primary Academy
- The Oaks Primary School
