= Campus Living Villages =

Campus Living Villages Pty Limited
- Type: Private
- Industry: Accommodation provider
- Founded: 2003
- Founder: Campus Living Funds Management Limited (CLFM)
- Headquarters: Sydney, Australia
- Services: Accommodation
- Total assets: AU $1.3billion
- Owner: Campus Living Villages
- Website: www.campuslivingvillages.com

Campus Living Villages (CLV) is a global student accommodation provider with services in finance, design, development, project management and operation of student housing. CLV is one of the largest higher education student housing providers in the world. It opened its first student village at the University of Sydney in Australia in 2003 and has since expanded internationally to own, manage or develop over 45,000 beds across Australia, the United Kingdom and the United States.

A number of Australian pension funds back the business.

== History ==
2003: Australia

Campus Living Villages AU established its first student accommodation village, Sydney University Village, at the University of Sydney.

2005: New Zealand

Campus Living Villages NZ expanded operations into New Zealand, signing its first lease with Massey University. This was followed by the acquisition of the University of Canterbury's student accommodation, including an agreement to develop further housing on campus. In September 2019, the body of a student resident, of its Sonoda Christchurch Campus, was found dead in his room.

2006: United States, Century Campus Housing Management, L.P. acquisition

On 23 March 2006, Campus Living Villages US acquired the United States business, Century Campus Housing Management L.P., adding approximately 20,000 beds to the portfolio. Century Campus Housing Management, formerly a subsidiary of Century Development, was founded in 1986.

2008: United Kingdom

Campus Living Villages UK acquired its first United Kingdom property in December 2008 when it bought 755 student flat units from the University of Salford in Manchester, England, and opened University of Salford Student Village.

2015: United Kingdom

In September 2015, a multimillion-pound luxury student village in Salford opened for the University, it was named Peel Park Quarter after the park which is situated alongside. Features in the buildings included deluxe en-suite bedrooms and floor-to-ceiling windows which showcased views overlooking the park and the Manchester skyline. Communal social spaces play host to pool tables and other games facilities inside, while the lounges feature Sky TV and the latest games consoles. There's also two 30-seater cinema rooms and a free gym on site.

== Controversy ==
=== Death of Mason Pendrous ===
In 2019 Mason Pendrous, a 19-year-old student at Canterbury University in New Zealand, was found dead at Sonoda Christchurch Campus, one of CLV's student accommodation facilities in New Zealand. Pendrous had been missing for between two and four weeks before his body was discovered in his room by another student. An independent investigation into the incident showed that CLV had failed to adequately follow processes to monitor student welfare.
