= Clayden =

Clayden is a surname. Notable people with the surname include:

- Arthur Clayden (1829–1899), New Zealand journalist and emigration agent
- Arthur W. Clayden (1855-1944), British scientist, first principal of Royal Albert Memorial College
- Bertha Clayden (1881−1958), British police officer
- Charles Clayden, English footballer
- George Clayden (1903–1990), Australian footballer
- James Clayden, Australian director and painter
- John Clayden (1904–1986), South African judge
- Jonathan Clayden (born 1968), British chemist
- JS Clayden (born 1971), British singer-songwriter
- Pauline Clayden (1922–2026), British ballerina
- Peter Clayden (1827–1902), British journalist and author
- Rodney Clayden (born 1945), British swimmer
