= Andrew Lang Lecture =

The Andrew Lang Lecture series is held at the University of St. Andrews. The lectures are named after Andrew Lang, a graduate of the university.

== Lectures ==
- December 1927 – "Andrew Lang", by George Gordon.
- 1928 – "Andrew Lang's work for Homer", by Alexander Shewan.
- 1929 – "The raw material of religion", by R. R. Marett.
- 1930 – "Andrew Lang as historian", by Robert S. Rait.
- 1931 – "Andrew Lang and the Maid of France", by Louis Cazamian
- 1932 – "Andrew Lang and the Border", by John Buchan (Lord Tweedsmuir).
- 6 December 1933 – "Lang, Lockhart and biography", by H. J. C. Grierson.
- 21 November 1934 – "Andrew Lang and the House of Stuart", by John Duncan.
- 1937 – "Andrew Lang's poetry", by A. Blyth Webster.
- 8 March 1939 – "On Fairy-Stories", by J. R. R. Tolkien
- 7 May 1947 – "Andrew Lang the poet", by Gilbert Murray.
- 5 April 1948 – "Law and custom", by Hugh Pattisan MacMillan, Baron MacMillan.
- 11 May 1949 – "Andrew Lang and the casket letter controversy", by J. B. Black.
- 11 May 1950 – "Andrew Lang and journalism", by J. B. Salmond.
- 25 April 1951 – "Andrew Lang: his place in anthropology", by Herbert J. Rose.
- 14 November 1951 – "Andrew Lang, John Knox and Scottish Presbyterianism", by William Croft Dickinson.
- 16 February 1955 – "Homer and his forerunners", by Maurice Bowra.
- 14 November 1956 – "Shakespeare's Scotland", by James Fergusson.
- 8 February 1978 – "The writing of Scottish history in the time of Andrew Lang", R.G. Cant.
- (not known) 1980 – "Physiological Symbols", Rodney Needham.
- 26 January 1988 – "The Scottish paradox", by Gordon Wilson
- 29 April 2004 – "Hamlet and the Tables of Memory", by Peter Stallybrass
- 1 November 2012 – "Folklore versus Fakelore: An Imagined Conversation with Andrew Lang", by Jane Yolen, the first woman to give the Andrew Lang lecture
- 31 October 2017 – "Andrew Lang and the Folkloristic Legacy of 'The Forest'", by Lizanne Henderson, 90th Anniversary Lecture
- 16 February 2021 – "Andrew Lang's Fairy Tales", by Andrew Teverson, the first Andrew Lang lecture to be delivered on-line
