= Professor of Scottish History and Literature =

Chair of Scottish History and Literature

Chair of Scottish History and Literature University of Glasgow
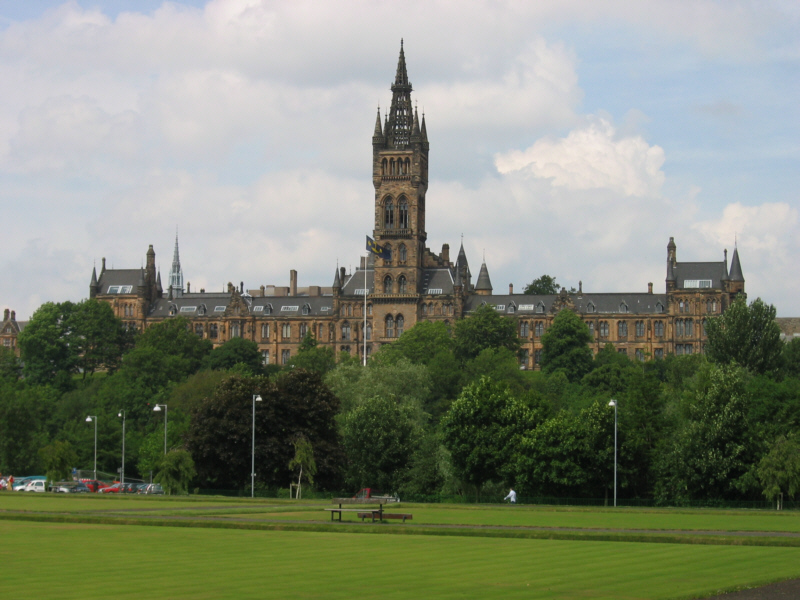
- Formation: 1913
- First holder: Sir Robert Rait
- Website: www.gla.ac.uk/history

The Chair of Scottish History and Literature at the University of Glasgow was founded in 1913, endowed by a grant from the receipts of the 1911 Scottish Exhibition held in Glasgow's Kelvingrove Park, as well as donations from the Merchants House of Glasgow and other donors. The chair has been held by a number of prominent historians of Scotland, including two Historiographers Royal. Although the chair is now based within the Department of History, it retains its original title.

== History ==
The inaugural holder of the chair was Robert Rait, appointed in 1913, a graduate of King's College, Aberdeen (now the University of Aberdeen) and tutor at New College, Oxford. In this role he sought to engage more closely with students than was traditional for academics at the time, inviting students to tea at his home. From 1915-1918 during the First World War, Rait worked at the War Trade Intelligence Department in London, and was awarded a CBE in 1918. In 1919, he was appointed Historiographer Royal of Scotland, a member of the Royal Household in Scotland, also serving for a time as dean of the Faculty of Arts in the university. He became a prominent figure in the intellectual and cultural life of the city, frequently contributing letters and articles to the Glasgow Herald, often anonymously. Rait's research generally maintained a Scottish focus, with particular reference to the politics of pre-Union Scotland and its relationship with England. He published History of Scotland in 1914, The Parliaments of Scotland in 1924, Critical Moments in British History in 1925 and King James's Secret in 1927. One of his most noted works, Thoughts on the Union between England and Scotland (1920), was written with leading constitutional theorist A. V. Dicey, former Vinerian Professor of English Law at the University of Oxford.

In 1929, Rait was appointed Principal of the University. He remained in post as professor for a year, publishing a History of the Union Bank of Scotland in 1930, but resigned later that year, succeeded by John Duncan Mackie, previously Professor of Modern History at Bedford College (predecessor institution of Royal Holloway), who had initiated the teaching of Scottish History at the University of St Andrews on being appointed a lecturer there at only twenty-two years old. His publications whilst in the chair included Andrew Lang and the House of Stuart (1935) and The Earlier Tudors 1485-1558 (1952). As part of the university's Quincentenrary celebrations, he wrote a short history, The University of Glasgow, 1451-1951, published in 1954. He was dean of faculties, an honorary post within the university, from 1940 to 1945. He remained in post until his retirement in 1957, when he was appointed Historiographer Royal. He returned to teaching in 1961 as emeritus professor, served again as dean of faculties from 1961 to 1964, and published a short History of Scotland in 1964.

The chair in the meantime was taken up on Mackie's retirement by George Pryde. Pryde had come to Glasgow as an assistant in the Scottish History Department in 1927, having studied at St Andrews (MA 1922, PhD 1926) and Yale (on a Commonwealth Fund fellowship) Universities. He served as President of the Historical Association of Scotland (wound up in 1964) and Chairman of Council of the Scottish History Society, and was an authority on the history of the Scottish burgh. He died in office.

Pryde was succeeded in the chair in 1962 by Archie Duncan, who had previously lectured in History at Queen's University Belfast (1951-1953) and the University of Edinburgh (1953-1961) and undertaken a Leverhulme Fellowship (1961-1962). He was editor of the Scottish Historical Review from 1963 to 1970, became a Fellow of the Royal Society of Edinburgh in 1979, and like his predecessor in the chair served for a time as president of the Scottish History Society. Amongst his significant works were Scotland, The Making of the Kingdom (1975) and Regesta Regum Scottorum, v; The Acts of Robert I, 1306-1329 (1988). He was Clerk of Senate (an office with status equivalent to a vice-principal) from 1978 to 1983, retired in 1993 becoming emeritus professor, and was dean of faculties from 1998 until 2000. He remains active in research and continues contributing articles to scholarly journals.

Duncan retired in 1993 and was succeeded the following year by professor Edward J. Cowan, who is also director of the university's Crichton Campus. In 2012, Professor Cowan was succeeded by professor Dauvit Broun.

== List of professors ==
- 1913–1930: Sir Robert Sangster Rait
- 1930–1957: J. D. Mackie
- 1957–1961: George Smith Pryde
- 1962–1993: Archibald Duncan
- 1994–2009: Edward J. Cowan
- 2009– : Dauvit Broun

== See also ==
- List of Professorships at the University of Glasgow
