= Archie Duncan =

Archie Duncan may refer to:

- Archie Duncan (historian) (1926–2017), Scottish historian
- Archie Duncan (actor) (1914–1979), Scottish actor
