= Kimberly J. Lau =

American professor of literature

- Born: c. 1970 (age c. 55)
- Occupations: Academic and author

Academic background
- Education: University of California, Berkeley (BA); University of Pennsylvania (PhD)
- Thesis: "Ideology Incorporated: From Bodily Practice to Body Product"

Academic work
- Discipline: Literary scholar
- Sub-discipline: Fairy tale studies, feminist theory and gender studies, critical race theory, monster studies, and popular culture
- Institutions: University of California, Santa Cruz
- Website: https://www.kimberlyjlau.com/

Kimberly J. Lau (born c. 1970) is an American academic whose expertise lies in fairy tale studies, feminist theory and gender studies, critical race theory, monster studies, and popular culture. She is Professor of Literature at the University of California, Santa Cruz.

== Education ==
Kimberly Lau attended the University of California, Berkeley, receiving a BA in Rhetoric in 1990 and an M.L.I.S. in Library and Information Science in 1993. In 1998, Lau completed her PhD in Folklore and Folklife at the University of Pennsylvania.

== Career ==
Lau was Assistant Professor of English and Gender Studies at the University of Utah from 1998 to 2005. She is a Professor of Literature at the University of California, Santa Cruz, where she began as an Associate Professor of American Studies in 2006. While at UC Santa Cruz, Lau was Provost of Oakes College from 2008 to 2014, and in 2024, she was appointed Provost of College Nine and John R. Lewis College.

In December 2024, Lau published Specters of the Marvelous: Race and Development of the European Fairy Tale through Wayne State University Press. The book "traces the historical and cultural notions of race among canonical fairy tale collections from four European countries, analyzing Giambattista Basile's The Tale of Tales (Italy, 1634–1636), Marie-Catherine d'Aulnoy's Fairy Tales (France, 1697), Jacob and Wilhelm Grimm's Children and Household Tales (Germany, 1812–1857), and Andrew and Nora Lang's Colored Fairy Books (Great Britain, 1812–1857)."

== Awards and honors ==
- 2011 - Elli Köngäs-Maranda Professional Prize, American Folklore Society
- 2015 - Elli Köngäs-Maranda Professional Prize, American Folklore Society

== Works ==
=== Selected authored books ===
- Erotic Infidelities: Love and Enchantment in Angela Carter's the Bloody Chamber (Wayne State University Press, 2014) ISBN 9780814339336
- Specters of the Marvelous: Race and Development of the European Fairy Tale (Wayne State University Press, 2024) ISBN 9780814351536

=== Selected edited books ===
- (with Peter Tokofsky and Stephen D. Winick, eds.) What Goes Around Comes Around: The Circulation of Proverbs in Contemporary Life (Utah University Press, 2004) ISBN 9780874215922

=== Selected articles and book chapters ===
- "A Desire for Death: The Grimms' Sleeping Beauty in The Bloody Chamber." In Transgressive Tales: Queering the Grimms, ed. Kay Turner and Pauline Greenhill. (Wayne State University Press, 2012) ISBN 9780814334812
- "Imperial Marvels: Race and the Colonial Imagination in the Fairy Tales of Madame D'Aulnoy." Narrative Culture 3.2 (2017): 141-179.
- "Masculinity and Melancholia at the Virtual End: Leaving the World (of Warcraft)." differences: A Journal of Feminist Cultural Studies 28.3 (2017): 44-66.
- "The Vampire, the Queer, and the Girl: Reflections on the Politics and Ethics of Immortality." Signs: Journal of Women in Culture and Society 44.1 (2018): 3-24.
- "Power"("Helen Oyeyemi's Fairy Tale Novels and the Archaeology of a Genre"). In A Cultural History of the Fairy Tale, Volume 6 (The Modern Age), ed. Andrew Teverson. (Bloomsbury, 2021) ISBN 9781350095731
- "Monstrous Longings in the Age of Insurrection: A Twilight Postmortem." In Möbius Media: Popular Culture, Folklore, and the Folkloresque, ed. Michael Dylan Foster and Jeffrey A. Tolbert. (Utah State University Press, 2024) ISBN 9781646426010
