= Scottish Exhibition of National History, Art and Industry =

The Scottish Exhibition of National History, Art and Industry was held in Glasgow in 1911. It was the third of 4 international exhibitions held in Glasgow, Scotland during the late 19th and early 20th centuries.

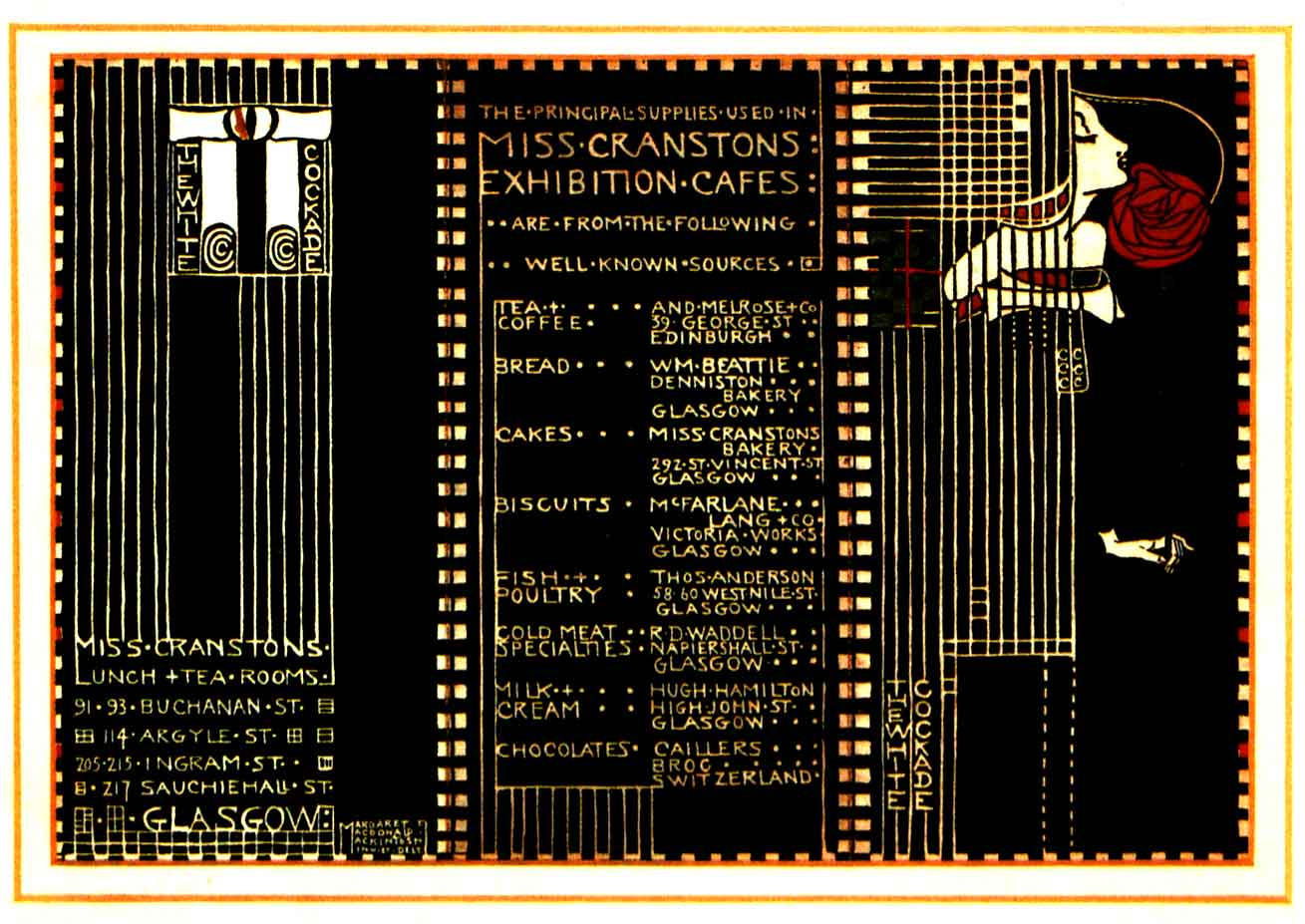
A menu from Miss Cranston's tea room at the exhibition.

== Summary ==
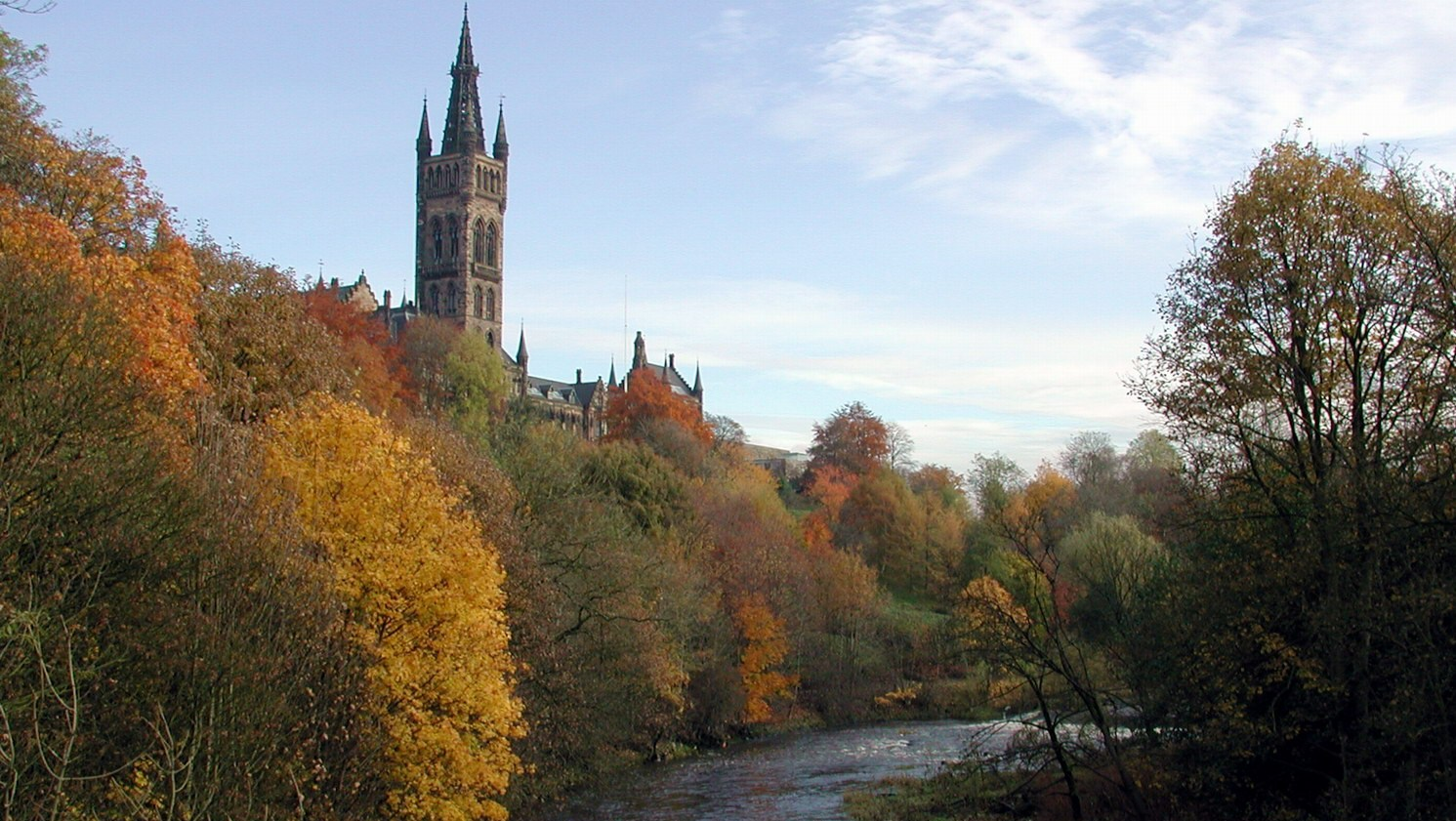
The University's tower overlooking the site of the exhibition

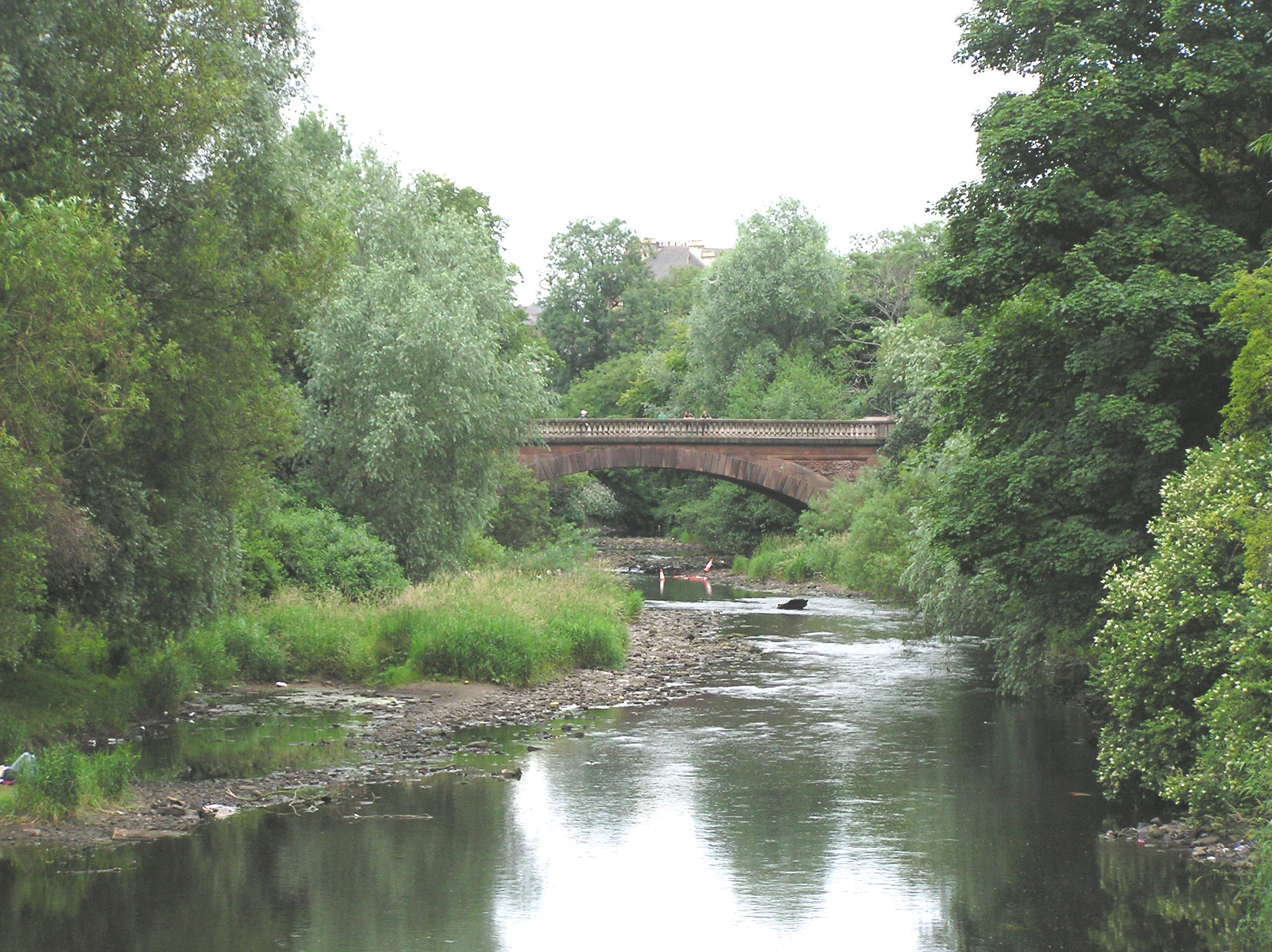
Kelvin river running through the site of the exhibition.

The exhibition followed the lead of the previous two exhibitions (Glaswegian exhibition (1888) and Glasgow International Exhibition (1901)) and took place at Kelvingrove Park. It ran from 2 May to 4 November 1911, and recorded over 9.3 million visits. The aim of the event was to fund a Chair of Scottish History and Literature at the University of Glasgow, with the Exhibition Prospectus quoting the resolution of a March 1909 meeting: "the time had fully arrived when Scottish history should be placed on a differing plane from that which it had hitherto occupied in the education of the rising generations." Although the size of this National exhibition was largely similar to that of its International predecessors, it garnered little attention from the London-based national press.

== Exhibits ==
The fair was held close to the River Kelvin structured around the Stewart Memorial and included a Palaces of History (based on the Falkland Palace, Industries, and Art, a Concert Hall and an Aviation Building as well as exhibits of Decorative Art. The site used was further east than the 1911 event, and excluded Kelvingrove Art Gallery and Museum.

Entertainments included boat trips, an aerial railway and a Highland Village (from which a cairn marking the village remains).

In addition to the Highlanders in the Highland Village, the event also featured other displays of people, from both Lapland and West Africa. The latter comprised around 100 individuals, including children, from Equatorial Africa, the French Congo, Dahomey and Sudan. Their performances of religious ceremonies, singing, and dancing were popular, despite some objections at the time that the inclusion of these human exhibits lowered the serious quality of the Exhibition. The language of the exhibition pamphlet ('Souvenir of a Visit to the West African Colonies') reveals racist attitudes toward these groups as primitive, or unclean, and discussed their countries mainly in terms of what benefit they brought to the colonising country.

== Legacy and remnants ==
The land upon which the exhibition sat is now still in use as Kelvingrove Park.

Profits from the fair successfully funded the establishment of a Chair of Scottish History and Literature at the University of Glasgow in 1913; the post originally being filled by Robert Rait.

== Popular culture ==
Neil Munro gives a satirical account of a visit by Erchie MacPherson and his wife Jinnet to the exhibition in his story "The MacPhersons at the "Ex"", first published in the Glasgow Evening News of 29th May 1911.

== See also ==
- International Exhibition of Science, Art and Industry (1888)
- Glasgow International Exhibition (1901)
- Empire Exhibition, Scotland 1938
- Glasgow Garden Festival (1988)

Preceded by Glasgow International Exhibition	World's fairs held in Glasgow; 1911	Succeeded by Empire Exhibition, Scotland 1938
