= Annie Cameron =

Scottish historian

Annie Cameron OBE
- Born: Annie Isabella Cameron; 10 May 1897; Glasgow, U.K.
- Died: 23 March 1973 (aged 75)
- Other name: Annie Dunlop
- Education: Edinburgh
- Occupation: Historian

Annie Isabella Cameron OBE (10 May 1897 – 23 March 1973), later Annie Dunlop, was a Scottish historian, editor, and university lecturer, but primarily "an independent scholar whose sole inspiration was the love of her subject."

== Early life and education ==
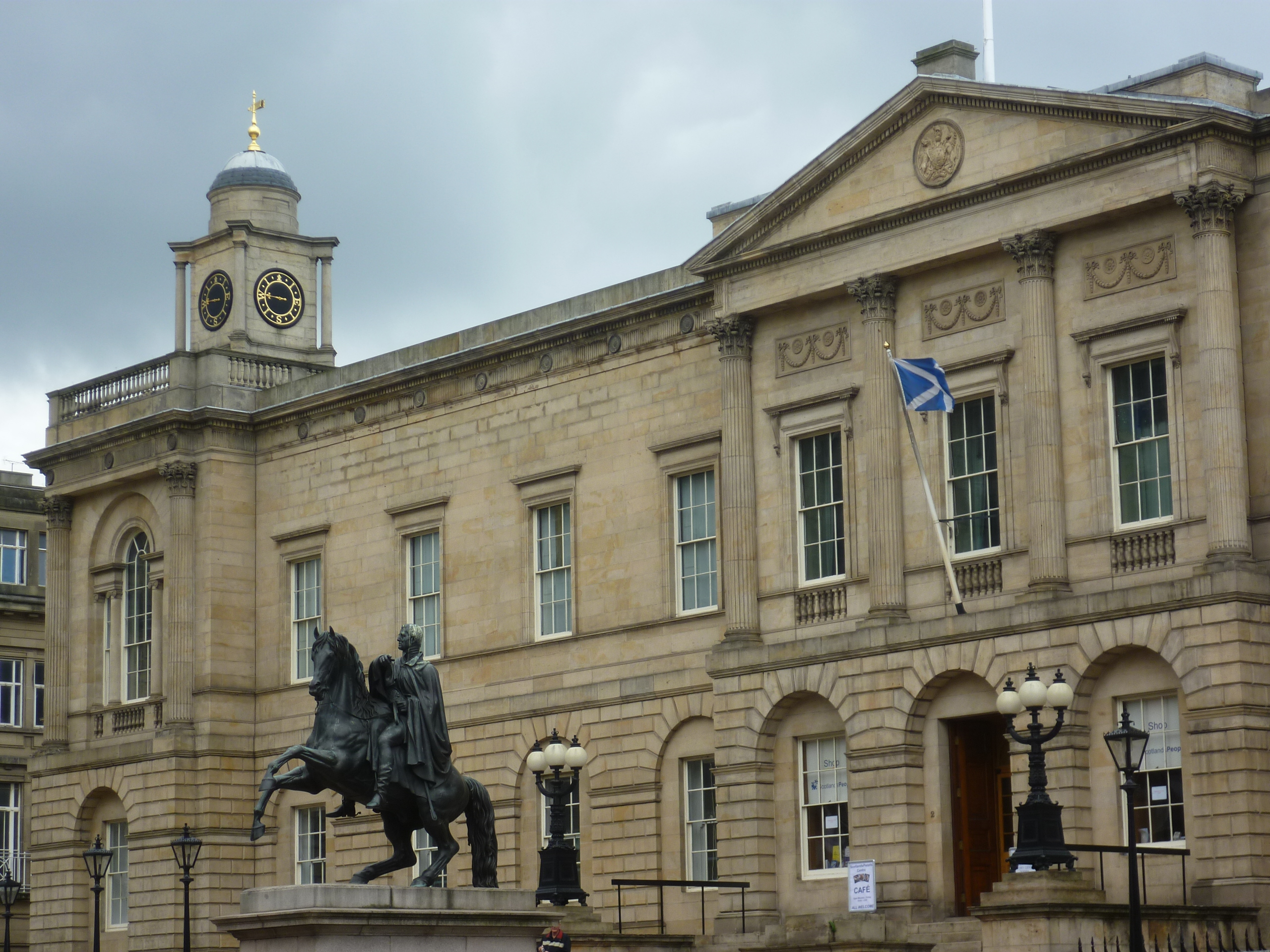
The Register House - offices of the Scottish Record Office

Cameron was born in Glasgow, at 16 Grafton Square, the daughter of Mary Sinclair, and James Cameron, a Glasgow engineer. By 1911 her family had moved to Strathaven, where she attending school. She then studied history at the University of Glasgow, being awarded a first class honours in 1919. She undertook teacher training at Jordanhill College in Glasgow but after a brief stint as a teacher, she returned to university to study for a PhD, where she was supervised by Professor R.K. Hannay at Edinburgh University. She then wrote a doctoral thesis on Bishop Kennedy of St Andrews and her degree was awarded on 17 July 1924. In 1927, she undertook a diploma in paleography at the British School at Rome. In 1928 she was awarded a Carnegie Research Fellowship to undertake research in Rome. While in Rome, her searches of the Vatican Archives found fifteenth century material relating to Scotland, especially for the Scottish Supplications to Rome. The publication of this archival material would become her life’s work.

== Career ==
Cameron worked at the Scottish Record Office. In 1944 she is recorded as being a part-time lecturer in Scottish History at the University of Edinburgh. She became an Officer of the Order of the British Empire (OBE) in 1942. At the end of her life, she received the papal Benemerenti medal, for her research in the Vatican archives.

Marcus Merriman, a historian of the Rough Wooing, acknowledged Annie Cameron, Marguerite Wood, and Gladys Dickinson for their work with the Scottish History Society publishing 16th-century primary sources. He praised Cameron for her "stunning" edition of the Scottish correspondence of Mary of Guise, "placing in the hands of the researcher something formidably useful." "Mrs Dunlop's most singular gift to medieval studies was her connecting Scotland and its scholars with Rome and its archives," wrote American historian Robert Brentano.

== Personal life ==
In 1938, Cameron married George Dunlop, proprietor of the Kilmarnock Standard. She died in 1973. "Annie Cameron Dunlop was a remarkable, a unique medievalist," Robert Brentano recalled in 1974, comparing her to "an Alfred Hitchcock super-spy in the guise of a quiet, elderly woman sitting unobtrusively and Britishly in the corner of a compartment of a continental train."

== Selected publications ==
- Scottish Correspondence of Mary of Lorraine (Edinburgh: SHS, 1927).
- (with Robert S. Rait), King James's Secret: Negotiations between Elizabeth and James VI relating to the Execution of Mary Queen of Scots, from the Warrender Papers (London: Nisbet, 1927).,
- Warrender Papers, 2 vols (Edinburgh: SHS, 1931)
- The Apostolic Camera and Scottish Benefices, 1418–1488 (1934)
- Calendar State Papers Scotland: 1593-1595, vol. 11 (1936)
- "Scottish Student Life in the Fifteenth Century", The Scottish Historical Review, 26:101 (1947)
- The Life and Times of James Kennedy, Bishop of St Andrews (1950)
- "The Date of the Birth of James III" (1951, with William Angus)
- The Royal Burgh of Ayr: Seven Hundred and Fifty Years of History (Oliver and Boyd, 1953)
- Acta Facultatis Artium Universitatis Sanctiandree, 1413–1588 (Edinburgh: SHS, 1964).
- Calendar of Scottish Supplications to Rome, 1428-1432 (1970, co-editor, with Ian B. Cowan)
