= Edward J. Cowan =

Scottish historian (1944–2022)

Edward James Cowan FRSE (15 February 1944 – 2 January 2022) was a Scottish historian.

== Life and career ==
Edward James Cowan was born in Edinburgh, Midlothian, Scotland on 15 February 1944. Educated at Dumfries Academy, in his sixth year he was Head Boy and played Petruchio in a production of Shakespeare's The Taming of the Shrew.

He was a professor of Scottish History at the University of Glasgow and Director of the University's Dumfries Campus. He had previously taught at the University of Edinburgh and at the University of Guelph, Ontario. A fellow of the Royal Society of Edinburgh, he was also a visiting professor in Australia, New Zealand, Canada and the United States.

Cowan lived in the Glenkens area of Kirkcudbrightshire. He died from lung cancer at his home in Balmaclellan, on 2 January 2022, at the age of 77.

== Books ==
- Northern lights: the Arctic Scots (Edinburgh: Birlinn Ltd, 2023) 412pp. ISBN 978-1-78027-787-5. Posthumous, manuscript gathered and finalised by the late author's wife, Lizanne Henderson Cowan.
- Ed., with Michael Ansell and Ronald Black, Galloway: The Lost Province of Gaelic Scotland (John Dewar Publishers Ltd., 2022) 439pp.
- Folk in Print: Scotland’s Chapbook Heritage, 1750-1850, with Mike Paterson (Edinburgh: John Donald, 2007) 438pp.
- Ed. The Wallace Book (Edinburgh: John Donald, 2007) 240pp.
- 'For Freedom Alone': The Declaration of Arbroath 1320 (East Linton: Tuckwell Press, 2003) 162pp.
- Scottish History: The Power of the Past, ed. with Richard Finlay (Edinburgh: Edinburgh University Press, 2002) 279pp.
- Scottish Fairy Belief: A History, with Lizanne Henderson (East Linton: Tuckwell Press, 2001; Edinburgh: Birlinn, 2007) 242pp.
- Alba: Celtic Scotland in the Medieval Era, ed. with R. A. McDonald (East Linton: Tuckwell Press, 2000; reprinted 2003) 282pp.
- Ed. The Ballad in Scottish History (East Linton: Tuckwell Press, 2000) 184pp.
- Scotland Since 1688: Struggle for a Nation, with Richard Finlay (London: CIMA, 2000) 192pp.
- The Polar Twins: Scottish History and Scottish Literature, ed. with Douglas Gifford (Edinburgh: John Donald, 1999) 310pp.
- Ed. The People's Past: Scottish Folk, Scottish History (Edinburgh: Polygon, 1980; reprinted 1995) 223pp.
- Montrose: For Covenant and King (London: Weidenfeld and Nicolson, 1977; reprinted Edinburgh: Canongate, 1995) 326pp. Winner of a Scottish Arts Council Award.

Academic offices
Preceded by Professor Archibald Duncan	Professor of Scottish History and Literature, Glasgow; 1994–2012	Succeeded by Dauvit Broun
