= Robert Munro (archaeologist) =

Scottish physician and noted amateur archaeologist

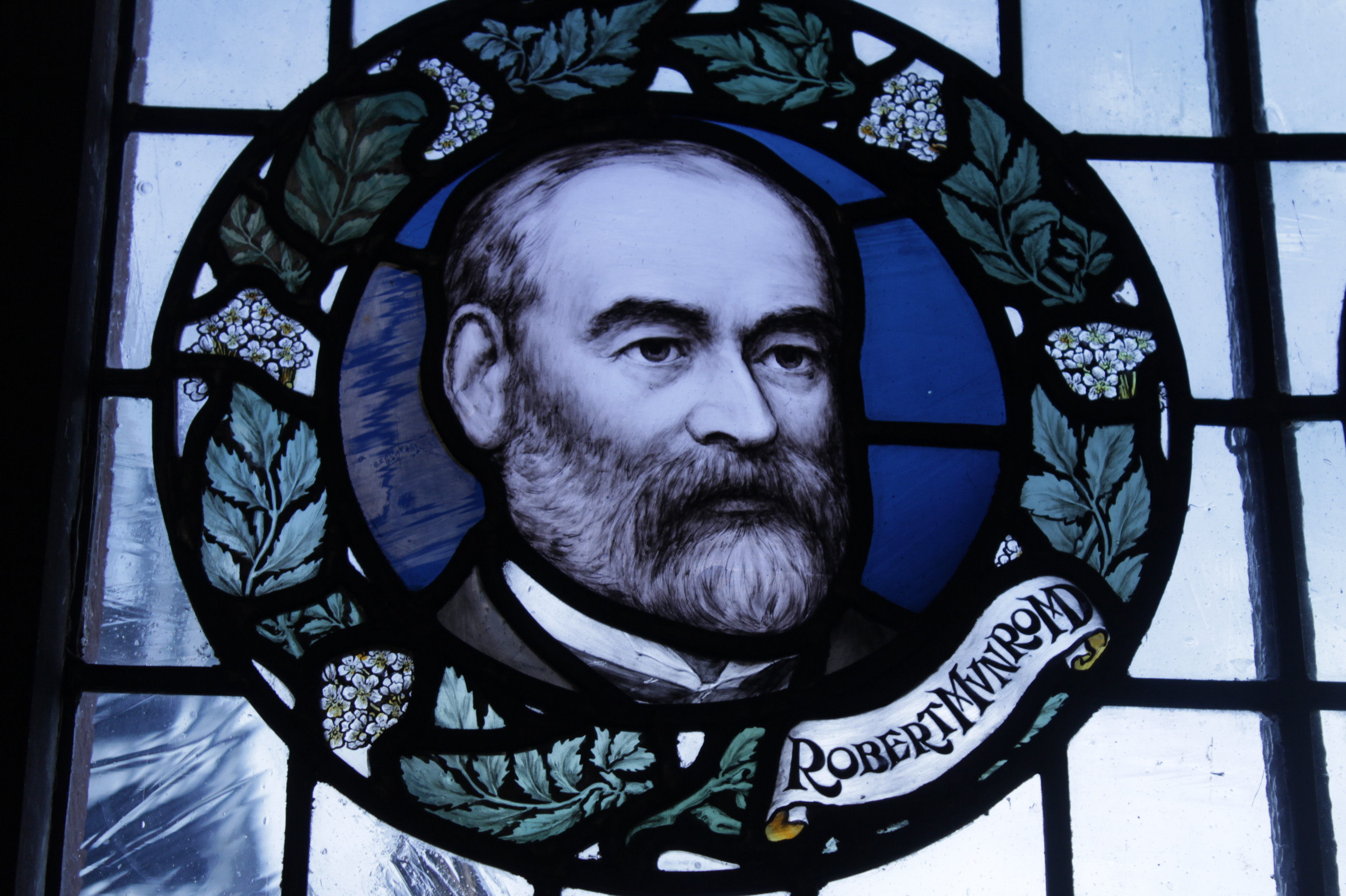
Stained glass of Dr Robert Munro FRSE in Scottish National Portrait Gallery

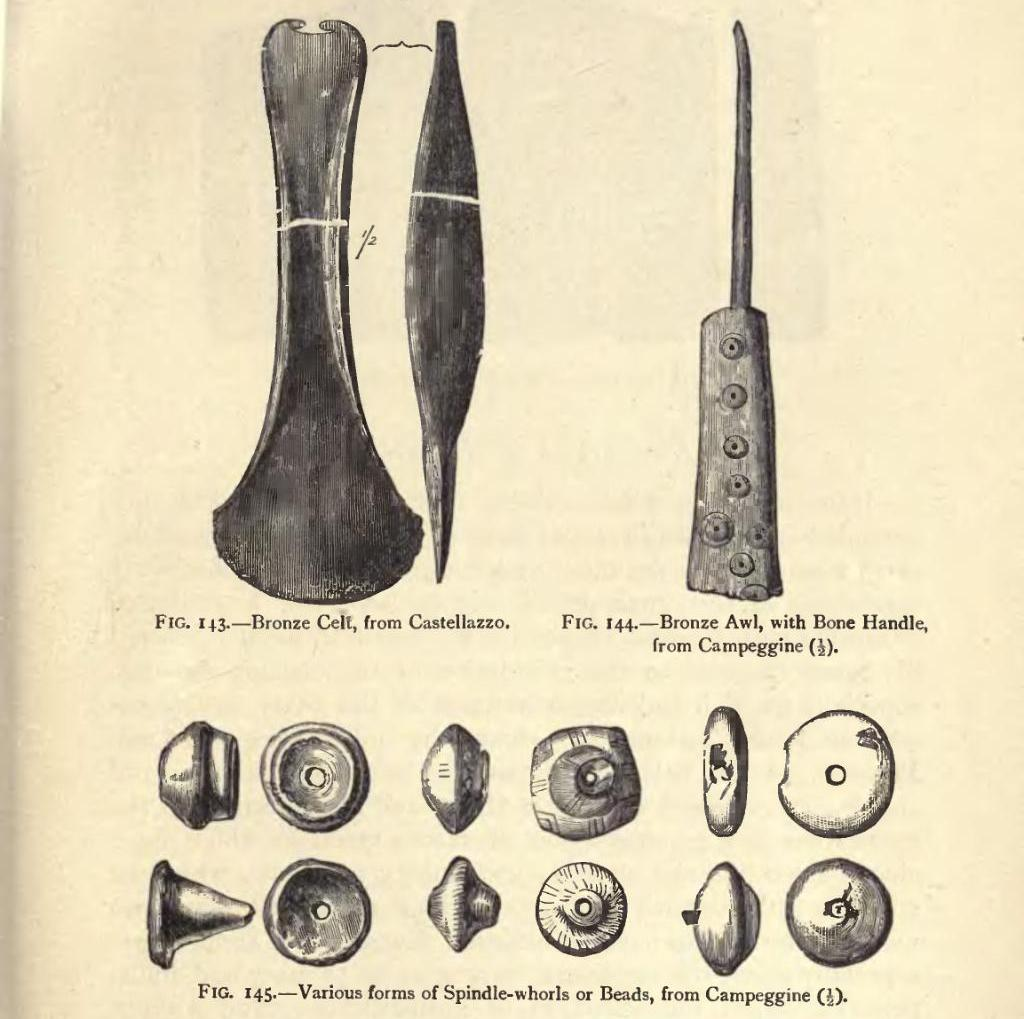
An illustration from Monro's Palæolithic Man and Terramara Settlements in Europe of a bronze celt (a prehistoric, chisel-bladed tool), a bronze and bone awl, and a variety of objects used either as beads or as spindle whorls.

Robert Munro FRSE FSA LLD (21 July 1835 – 18 July 1920) was a Scottish physician and noted amateur archaeologist.

Edinburgh University's Munro Lectures in Archaeology and Anthropology are named in his honour.

== Life ==
He was born on 21 July 1835 at Assynt in Rossshire, and educated at Kiltearn Free Church School, and at the Royal Academy in Tain. He studied medicine at the University of Edinburgh, graduating MA in 1860 and MB ChB in 1867. He worked as a general practitioner in Kilmarnock until 1886, when he turned his whole attention to archaeological research. He was a member of many learned societies at home and abroad and published several books on the subjects of his research.

In 1891 he was elected a Fellow of the Royal Society of Edinburgh. His proposers were Rev John Duns, Sir Arthur Mitchell, Alexander Buchan and Ramsay Heatley Traquair. He served as vice president of the society 1903 to 1908. In 1894 he was elected a member of the Harveian Society of Edinburgh.

In 1912 Munro began lecturing in anthropology and prehistoric archaeology at Edinburgh University.

He died on 18 July 1920.

== Family ==
In 1875 he married Anna Taylor (d.1907).

== Publications ==
- Ancient Scottish Lake Dwellings or Crannogs (1882)
- The Lake Dwellings of Europe: being the Rhind Lectures in Archaeology for 1888 (1890)
- Rambles and Studies in Bosnia, Herzegovina and Dalmatia, with an account of the Proceedings of the Congress of Archaeologists and Anthropologists held at Sarajevo, August 1894 (1895)
- Prehistoric Problems: being a selection of essays on the evolution of man and other controverted problems in anthropology and archæology (1897)
- Prehistoric Scotland and its Place in European Civilisation (1899)
- Man as Artist and Sportsman in the Palæolithic Period (1903)
- Archaeology and False Antiquities (1905)
- The Munro Bequest (1910)
- Palæolithic Man and Terramara Settlements in Europe: Being the Munro Lectures in Anthropology and Prehistoric Archæology in Connection with the University of Edinburgh, Delivered During February and March 1912 (1912)
- Prehistoric Britain (1913) .
- From Darwinism to Kaiserism: being a review of the origin, effects and collapse of Germany's attempt at world-dominion by methods of barbarism (1919)
- Autobiographic Sketch of Robert Munro, M.A., M.D., LL.D., 21st July, 1835 - 18th July, 1920 (1921)

Munro wrote articles for the 1911 Encyclopædia Britannica, attributed by the initials "R. Mu".
