= Arthur W. Clayden =

First principal of the Royal Albert Memorial College, Exeter

Arthur W. Clayden FGS FRMetS FCS FRAS
- Born: Arthur William Clayden; 12 December 1855; Boston, Lincolnshire, England
- Died: 12 February 1944 (aged 88); Parkstone, Dorset, England
- Occupations: Academic administrator; Earth scientist; natural historian
- Known for: Creator of the actinograph for meteorological research
- Spouse: Ethel Paterson (m. 1883)
- Parent: Peter Clayden

Academic background
- Education: University College School
- Alma mater: Christ's College, Cambridge (MA)

Academic work
- Discipline: Meteorology, Geology, Chemistry
- Institutions: Bath College; University of Cambridge; Royal Albert Memorial College

Principal of Royal Albert Memorial College
- In office 1893-1920
- Preceded by: first incumbent
- Succeeded by: Hector Hetherington

President of the Devonshire Association
- In office 1915
- Preceded by: Professor A. M. Worthington
- Succeeded by: Dr E. J. Allen

Notes
- Image credit: Lucerna Magic Lantern Web Resource, lucerna.exeter.ac.uk, item 5096454. Accessed 24 March 2026.

Arthur William Clayden (12 December 1855 - 12 February 1944) was an English Earth scientist and natural historian, known for being the first Principal of the Royal Albert Memorial College, Exeter, predecessor of the present day University of Exeter.

== Early life and education ==
Clayden was born on 12 December 1855 in Boston, Lincolnshire. His father was Peter Clayden, a Unitarian Minister and political journalist. His mother Jane (née Fowle) was his father's first wife. Clayden shared his first name with his uncle, Arthur Clayden, who was his father’s younger brother.

Clayden was educated at University College School, followed by Christ's College, Cambridge, where he sat the Natural Sciences Tripos. He graduated with a BA in 1877, which was upgraded to an MA (Cantab) in 1880.

== Academic career ==
From 1878 to 1887, Clayden worked as Science Master at Bath College. From 1887 to 1893, he was an "Extension Lecturer", officially employed by University of Cambridge. This role involved Clayden giving "outreach" academic lectures to different community groups.

In 1893, Exeter Technical and University Extension College was founded at what is now Royal Albert Memorial Museum. This college was the predecessor of the present day University of Exeter, and Clayden was appointed as the college's first principal as well as its chair of Physics and Geology. His teaching was referenced in the biography of Ernest Kennaway by James Wilfred Cook (who became the first Vice-Chancellor of the University of Exeter after it was granted royal charter in 1955):

Not long before [Kennaway’s] death, he wrote to me in the following terms about A. W. Clayden, a former head of the institution which is now the University of Exeter: ‘In the nineties he was my first instructor in Chemistry and in his favourite subjects of physiography and geology, of which he was an absolute born teacher; I have never enjoyed any teaching more than his.’ (Cook, 1958)

During his tenure as principal, the college building saw numerous extensions, and in 1899, a new wing was built, opened by the then Duke and Duchess of York (later King George V and Queen Mary), who also commended the college's achievement. The royal visit also led to the college being renamed Royal Albert Memorial College.

Clayden was succeeded as college principal by Hector Hetherington in 1920, under whose tenure the college gained funding from University Grants Committee and became University College of the South West. In his retirement, Clayden continued some of his teaching responsibilities, staying on as "visiting director" of the college's Geology and Geography department until his death in 1944.

During his academic career, Clayden published many articles in academic journals in a variety fields, namely meteorology, photography, astronomy, physics and geology. He also wrote two books: Cloud Studies (1905) and The History of Devon Scenery (1906).

Clayden was involved in many learned societies. He was a member of the Geographical section of the British Association, where he also co-founded the committee on Meteorological Photography in 1890, serving as its secretary. He also served as President of the Devonshire Association in 1915. His presidential address, delivered on 20 July, was titled, The Future of Higher Education in Exeter. Such was the influence of the speech that it led to the establishment of a Committee for the Furtherance of University Education in the South West, which eventually succeeded in Clayden's college receiving funding from the University Grants Committee in 1922 and finally receiving royal charter to become University of Exeter in 1955.

== Honours and recognition ==
Clayden was elected a fellow of the Geological Society of London in 1885, followed by the Royal Meteorological Society and the Chemical Society in 1886, and the Royal Astronomical Society in 1897. Having joined the Geologists' Association in 1899, Clayden was later made an honorary life member of the association.

In 1954, University of Exeter named its newly built residence for the Vice-Chancellor (then James Wilfred Cook) Clayden, after the first principal of the university's predecessor institution. The Clayden Building, located on Streatham Rise, currently houses Exeter University's Centre for Computational Social Science.

== Personal life ==
Clayden married his wife Ethel (née Paterson) in 1883. Their son, Arthur Ludlow, was born in 1883 in Bath, Somerset and went on to become a journalist. Their daughter, Hilda Marion, was born in 1885 and died in the same year at 2 months old.

Outside of his academic work, Clayden was known for being an avid and able painter. One of his paintings, “Outside the Sand Bar, Salcombe”, is currently held in University of Exeter’s Fine Arts collection.

Clayden died on 12 December 1944 at his home in Parkstone, Dorset, survived by his wife.

== Notable publications ==
- Clayden, Arthur William (1905). Cloud Studies. London: John Murray – via Project Gutenberg.
- Clayden, Arthur William (1906). The history of Devonshire scenery: an essay in geographical evolution. London: Chatto & Windus – via Internet Archive.
- Clayden, A. W. (1911). "Cloud" . In Chisholm, Hugh (ed.). Encyclopædia Britannica (11th ed.). Cambridge University Press.

Academic offices
Preceded by Office created	Principal of the Royal Albert Memorial College; 1893-1920	Succeeded by Hector Hetherington
