= Robert Rait =

Scottish historian (1874–1936)

Sir Robert Rait CBE DL

Principal of the University of Glasgow
- In office 1929–1936
- Preceded by: Sir Donald MacAlister
- Succeeded by: Sir Hector Hetherington

Professor of Scottish History and Literature, Glasgow
- In office 1913–1930
- Preceded by: New Chair
- Succeeded by: J. D. Mackie

Personal details
- Born: 10 February 1874 Narborough, Leicestershire, England
- Died: 25 May 1936 (aged 62) Glasgow, Scotland
- Spouse: Ruth Bridge (m. 1908)
- Education: University of Aberdeen (MA); New College, Oxford (BA)

Sir Robert Sangster Rait CBE DL (10 February 1874 – 25 May 1936) was a Scottish historian, Historiographer Royal and Principal of the University of Glasgow.

== Early life ==
Rait was born in 1874 in Narborough, Leicestershire to Scottish parents, although the family moved shortly afterwards to his parents' hometown of Aberdeen. He was educated at the University of Aberdeen, graduating MA in 1894. He then worked briefly as an assistant to the Professor of Logic at the university, publishing his first book, Universities of Aberdeen: A History, in 1895, before being elected to an Exhibition in Modern History at New College, Oxford, in 1896. He was awarded First Class Honours, won the Stanhope Prize and was elected a fellow of the college the same year. He worked as a lecturer at the college for three years, and in 1903 became a tutor.

== Glasgow ==
In 1913, Rait was appointed to the newly created Chair in Scottish History and Literature at the University of Glasgow, funded through the proceeds of the 1911 Scottish Exhibition of National History, Art, and Industry, held in the adjacent Kelvingrove Park. In this role he sought to engage more closely with students than was traditional for academics at the time, inviting students to tea at his home. From 1915 to 1918 during the First World War, Rait worked at the War Trade Intelligence Department in London, and was appointed a CBE in 1918. In 1919, he was appointed Historiographer Royal of Scotland, also serving for a time as Dean of the Faculty of Arts in the university. He became a prominent figure in the intellectual and cultural life of the city, frequently contributing letters and articles to the Glasgow Herald, often anonymously.

In 1929, Rait succeeded Sir Donald MacAlister as Principal of the university. In this role he sought continue the close relationship he had developed with students as a professor, relocating the Principal's office to the Main Building of the university, where it remains today, making his time more freely available to students and staff, and frequently entertaining guests at the Principal's Lodging. He was an immensely popular figure with students. After being knighted in 1933, he was met on his return from London to Glasgow Central station by hundreds of students and escorted to the university in a carriage drawn by Blues and led by the band of the OTC.

The depression of the 1930s had a heavy effect on the university financially and on the Principal's health. In September 1935, he developed a serious illness, during which time he was largely unable to carry out his duties and was deputised at Court by the Rector, Sir Iain Colquhoun. He died at the Principal's Lodging on 25 May 1936.

== Research ==
Rait's research generally maintained a Scottish focus, particularly with a reference to the politics of pre-Union Scotland and its relationship with England, although he also completed biographies of Field Marshal Viscount Gough and Field Marshal Sir Frederick Haines.

Publications:

- Universities of Aberdeen; a History, 1895
- The Scottish Parliament, 1901
- Relations between England and Scotland, 1901
- Lusus Regius, unpublished writings of King James I, 1901 (ed.)
- Five Stuart Princesses, 1902
- Life and Campaigns of Field Marshal Viscount Gough, 1903
- Life of Field Marshal Sir Frederick Paul Haines, 1911
- Scotland, in The Making of the Nations Series, 1911
- Acts and Ordinances of the Interregnum, 1642–1660 (with Prof. Sir C. H. Firth), 1911
- Life in the Mediæval University (Cambridge Manuals), 1912
- History of Scotland (Home University Library), 1914
- Dicey, Albert V.; Rait, Robert S. (1920). Thoughts on the Union between England and Scotland. London: Macmillan – via Internet Archive.
- The Parliaments of Scotland, 1924
- Rait, Robert S., ed. (1925). Memorials of Albert Venn Dicey: Being Chiefly Letters and Diaries. London: Macmillan – via Internet Archive.
- Critical Moments in British History, 1925
- King James's Secret (with Annie I Cameron), 1927
- History of the Union Bank of Scotland, 1930
- Scotland (with G. S. Pryde), 1934

== Personal life ==
Rait married Ruth Bridge in 1908, with whom he had two daughters. He was a member of the Athenæum in London, the Glasgow Art Club, the Western Club, Glasgow and the University Club, Edinburgh.

Academic offices
Preceded by Chair established	Professor of Scottish History and Literature, Glasgow; 1913 to 1930	Succeeded by J. D. Mackie
Preceded by Sir Donald MacAlister	Principal and Vice-Chancellor of the University of Glasgow; 1929 to 1936	Succeeded by Professor Sir Hector Hetherington
Court offices
Preceded by Professor Peter Brown	Historiographer Royal; 1919 to 1930	Succeeded by Professor Robert Hannay
