= George Neilson (historian) =

Scottish historian and lawyer

George Neilson LL.D FSAScot
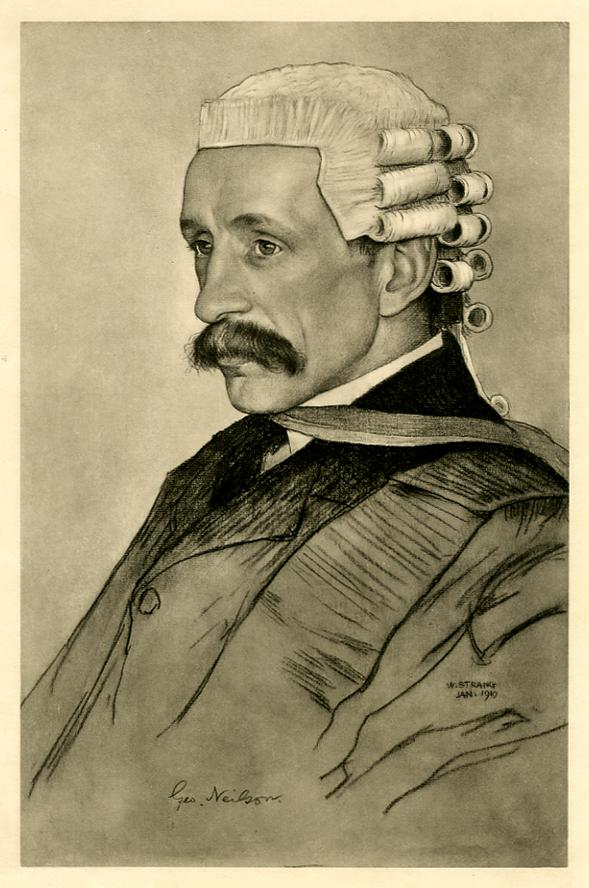
- Copy of a portrait of George Neilson, T. & R. Annan & Sons, 1910-11, after William Strang
- Born: 7 December 1858; Ruthwell, Dumfriesshire, Scotland
- Died: 15 November 1923 (aged 64); Partick, Glasgow, Scotland
- Education: King William's College, Isle of Man
- Occupations: Historian; Antiquary; Lawyer

George Neilson, LL.D., FSAScot, (7 December 1858 – 15 November 1923) was a Scottish historian, antiquary, and lawyer. Neilson is known for his scholarship relating to Scottish law, archaeology, and literature, with particular emphasis on medieval Scotland.

== Early and personal life ==
He was the only child of Edward Neilson (1830–1861), a captain in the merchant navy, and his wife, Janet Paterson (1831–1903). Edward Neilson died in Buenos Aires in 1861. George was brought up in a house in Ruthwell which belonged to his mother's family, Horseclose Farm. He was later married on 24 June 1892 to Jane Ann Richardson (1859–1945), the daughter of Thomas Richardson, a cattle dealer from Hexham, and his wife, Ann Short. Together they had one son, who died aged three on 14 March 1894, and one daughter.

== Education and career ==
Neilson was educated at Cummertrees parish school and, from January 1872 to Christmas 1873 attended King William's College on the Isle of Man. Neilson later worked as an apprentice at a writer's office in Dumfries, and was also enrolled in the Scottish law class of Professor Robert Berry at the University of Glasgow in 1879–80. Neilson finished joint first in class and subsequently did well in the conveyancing class in 1880–81. In 1881 he qualified as a solicitor and in 1884 became a partner in Messrs Stodart and Neilson, writers, at 58 West Regent Street, Glasgow. Throughout his life and career Neilson was active in various clubs and societies associated with his professional and academic interests. In 1889 he became the president of the Glasgow Juridical Society, and in 1890 he was elected a member of the Glasgow Archaeological Society, of which he later served as president from 1907 to 1910. On 6 November 1891 he was appointed procurator fiscal of police in Glasgow, later becoming fiscal of the Glasgow dean of guild court on 2 November 1899. In 1901 he made an application for the chair of Scottish history at the University of Edinburgh, but was unsuccessful. In 1904 Neilson was listed in the membership of the Thirteen Club, also known as the Glasgow Thirteen. This was an exclusive club which met in various restaurants throughout Glasgow to discuss literature and art. Neilson was the president of the Royal Philosophical Society of Glasgow from 1913 to 1915, and of the Edinburgh Sir Walter Scott Club from 1914 to 1918. On 29 December 1909 he was appointed the first stipendiary police magistrate of Glasgow, (Note: MacQueen, and others, give the date of appointment to stipendiary magistrate as 1909; the Scottish Law Review gives the date as 1910.) an office which he held until May 1923, when he resigned on account of ill health. Neilson died at his home, Wellfield, 76 Partickhill Road, Partick, Glasgow, on 15 November 1923 after suffering for more than a year with stomach and bowel disease.

== Scholarship ==
By his thirties Neilson had worked extensively with historical sources. In particular, he had amassed an in-depth knowledge of the sources of early Scottish history and of the history and development of Scottish law. He had also spent much time developing and honing the skills of an experienced charter scholar and an expert paleographer. Neilson was at the forefront of defining the direction of Scottish medieval studies amongst his contemporaries due to his first-hand experience of working with documents, charters, and records, as well as his ability to easily adapt to working with chronicles, place names, and topographical sources. Most of all, it was his tireless enthusiasm which meant he was constantly seeking to establish new arguments and undertake innovative research.

In 1887 he read Bracton's notebook, edited by Frederic William Maitland, which led Neilson to send a manuscript copy to Maitland of a study he had undertaken relating to the origin and early history of the duel. This work, which became Neilson's Trial by Combat, was well-received by Maitland and was published in Glasgow in 1890. The book was favourably received at the time and continues to be an important text, particularly in 'making clear the distinction between the judicial duel and the duel of chivalry'.

Neilson and Maitland continued to correspond, with Maitland regularly seeking guidance from Neilson on the subjects of Scottish law and history. Neilson also established relationships with numerous other scholars, in particular Mary Bateson, J. Horace Round, Andrew Lang, Francis J. Haverfield, Henry Charles Lea, and Felix Liebermann. Neilson continued to publish other major works, including Peel: its Meaning and Derivation in 1894, and in 1899 he published the Annals of the Solway. Outwith his traditional areas of medieval Scottish history Neilson also maintained an interest in Romano-British archaeology, a subject which he first explored in his Per lineam valli, published in 1891. This particular publication has been credited for developing new approaches to the study of Hadrian's Wall. Neilson was also responsible for editing a 'pioneering study' of the Antonine Wall, the Antonine Wall Report, for the Glasgow Archaeological Society in 1899.

Neilson spent much time focused on the study of Middle Scots verse and published extensively on the subject. He attempted to attribute the authorship of a series of alliterative poems to John Barbour. He further claimed that the poet Huchown was in fact Sir Hugh of Eglinton, and attributed numerous works to him. Neilson wrote extensively on these particular subjects in the journal The Athenaeum and elsewhere, and in so-doing built relationships with Henry Bradley, Frederick James Furnivall, W. P. Ker, Walter William Skeat, and others. Neilson's attributions of works to the likes of Barbour and Elginton are, however, largely no longer supported or upheld by current scholars.

The University of Glasgow invited Neilson to deliver a series of lectures on early Scottish literature in 1902, and in 1903 the university conferred an honorary degree of LLD upon him. Towards the end of his scholarly career he revisited his initial areas of expertise of legal and feudal history. In 1912 Neilson was invited by the Society of Antiquaries of Scotland, of which he was then a vice-president, to deliver the Rhind Lectures in archaeology on the subject of Some Aspects of Scottish Feudalism for the 1913 series of lectures. (Note: Brown and MacQueen state that Neilson gave the Rhind Lecture in 1912, however, the Society of Antiquaries of Scotland states in their December 1913 proceedings that Neilson gave the lecture 'this year'.) One of Neilson's best-known publications was the second volume of the Acta dominorum concilii, 1496-1501 (Acts of the Lords of Council). This publication was delayed by the First World War and was not released until 1918. The volume was edited by Neilson and Henry Paton, and has been described as a catalyst for later research exploring the origins of the Court of Session.

The last 20 years of Neilson's life were predominantly spent shaping the direction of, and contributing heavily to, the Scottish Historical Review, which was founded in 1903. Neilson was editor of the Review in 1904, and made a contribution to almost every issue of the journal, occasionally anonymously. Despite his extensive scholarly activities and research output Neilson was never successful in obtaining a position within a university setting, a situation which was often lamented by his contemporaries.

== George Neilson Papers ==
Over 300 items from Neilson's personal papers are housed within the Special Collections of the University of Glasgow. The collection is primarily focused upon Neilson's activities as a scholar and his academic work. Neilson's collection of manuscripts and charters, known as the Neilson Collection, are housed at the National Library of Scotland. This collection was bought by the Library in 1927 with the aid of the Reid Fund. Many of the manuscripts contain notes and marginalia in the hand of Neilson. The collection of manuscript volumes ranges in date from the 13th to the 20th century and consists of 168 individual items. The charters date from 1325 to 1840, and cover the areas of Scotland, England, Wales, and Italy. Outwith these historical manuscripts the National Library of Scotland also holds select correspondence and academic papers of George Neilson. Further correspondence and material relating to George Neilson can be found in Cambridge University Library, University of Manchester Library, and Aberdeen University Special Collections.

== Selected publications ==
=== Articles ===
- Annandale Under the Bruces: A Lecture (1887)
- 'Tenure by knight-service in Scotland', Juridical Review, xi (1899), pages 71–86, 173–186.
- The Franciscan: Some Footnotes, George Buchanan: Glasgow Quartercentenary Studies 1906 (1907), pages 297–332.
- "Blind Harry's ''Wallace'': Poet and Quasi-Historian". Essays and studies: by members of the English Association. 1: 85–112. ISSN 1359-1746. Wikidata Q108002017.
- 'Bruce versus Balliol, 1291-92', Scottish Historical Review, xvi (1918), pages 1–14.
- The March Laws, published posthumously and edited by Thomas I. Rae, Stair Society, Miscellany One, 26 (1971), pages 11–77.

=== Books ===
- Trial by Combat (1890)
- Per Lineam Valli (1891)
- Peel, its meaning and derivation (1894)
- Repentance Tower and its Tradition (1895)
- Old Annan: from the 12th century until 1547 (1896)
- Caudatus Anglicus: A Mediaeval Slander (1896)
- Annals of the Solway (1899)
- John Barbour, Poet and Translator (1900)
- Sir Hew of Eglintoun and Huchown off the Awle Ryale (1901)
- Huchown of the Awle Ryale, the Alliterative Poet (1902)
- Old Glasgow Essays (1905) (contributor)
- The original chronicle of Andrew of Wyntoun: printed on parallel pages from the Cottonian and Wemyss MSS., with the variants of the other texts (1903-1914) (joint editor)
- Acta Dominorum Concilii: Acts of the Lords of Council 1496–1501. Volume II (joint editor) (1918)
- The Norsemen in Alban (1923) (joint editor)
- Skene's Memorabilia Scotica, 1475-1612, and revisals of Regiam Majestatem (1923)
