= Ioana Ciolacu =

Romanian fashion designer

- Born: Ioana Ciolacu Miron; 21 November 1982 (age 43); Iași, Socialist Republic of Romania
- Education: London College of Fashion; University of the Arts London; University of Architecture
- Occupation: Fashion designer
- Label: Ioana Ciolacu
- Awards: Designer for Tomorrow 2013
- Website: www.ioanaciolacu.com

Ioana Ciolacu Miron Mistretu (Romanian: [iˈo̯ana tʃjoˈlaku]; born November 21, 1982) is a Romanian fashion designer and researcher. She is the founder and creative director of the womenswear label Ioana Ciolacu, known for combining architectural design principles with contemporary womenswear and sustainable fashion practices.

Ciolacu gained international recognition after winning the Designer for Tomorrow Award, mentored by British designer Stella McCartney. Her collections have been presented at international fashion weeks and trade fairs and have been featured in publications including Vogue, L’Officiel, or Elle Magazine.

Alongside her fashion practice, Ciolacu has been involved in cultural initiatives and fashion education in Romania and has pursued doctoral research focused on sustainability in fashion design.

== Early life ==
Ciolacu was born in Iași, Romania. She is an only child. Her father is an architect. As a young girl, Ciolacu spent her summers in Focșani and in the Romanian countryside. In 1992, she enrolled at the Iași Waldorf School, where she developed an early interest in art, craft, and ecological awareness.

After graduating from high school, she enrolled at Ion Mincu University of Architecture and Urban Planning in Bucharest, where she specialized in Architecture. While in her 5th year of study, she decided to switch her career path by enrolling at Bucharest National University of Arts, while continuing to study Architecture. She graduated in 2010 as a Junior architect, and in 2011 as a Fashion designer.

== Career ==
While in school, Ciolacu won the European Fashion Award FASH Berlin. Right after graduation, she began working as a design assistant for landscape artist and photographer Katja Perrey at the National University of Arts. In this period, Ciolacu also developed her first ready-to-wear line with local commercial success.

In 2012, she received a Rector's Scholarship at University of the Arts London, London College of Fashion and moved to London to study for a master's degree in Fashion Design and Technology – Womenswear.

While in school, she won the Designer for Tomorrow Award, patroned by Stella McCartney, followed by a year of mentorship in which she was coached by the designer in her London studios or backstage at the designer's Paris show.

After graduating in 2013, she moved back to Bucharest and launched her own fashion label.

In the summer of 2014, she first presented her Spring Summer 2015 collection at Mercedes Benz Fashion Week Berlin and in the same year she showed her collection twice at trade fair Who's Next Paris and started selling her collection on Moda Operandi and Peek&Cloppenburg international retailers.

In the following year, she attended Who's Next Paris for the third time and Ciff Copenhagen with her Autumn Winter 2015–2016 collection which was presented at Mercedes Benz Fashion Week Berlin.

In 2015, Vogue.com introduced Ioana's Autumn Winter 2015–2016 collection as one of the reference collections for the season.

In April 2015, Ciolacu opened her online shop and launched her SS15 video campaign Lure. Directed by Anton and Damian Groves and produced by Studioset, the video won several awards at the Miami Fashion Film Festival.

In 2016, Ciolacu developed an ethical knitwear line supporting local craftsmanship and wool trade.

In 2017, Ciolacu opened the brand's first showroom in downtown Bucharest.

== Notable collections ==
Bauhaus Women (Spring/Summer 2018)

The collection explored the creative legacy of women associated with the Bauhaus movement and combined geometric silhouettes with architectural garment construction.

Bare Necessities / The Knot Dress

This collection explored material reuse and sustainable production techniques through recycled textile elements and experimental draping.

== Career since 2020 ==
Since 2020, Ciolacu has continued to develop her fashion practice while expanding her involvement in cultural initiatives and fashion education.

She has presented collections during Romanian Creative Week, contributing to the promotion of contemporary Romanian fashion and emerging designers.

Her collections have also been presented at international fashion trade fairs including Tranoï Tokyo and MOMAD Madrid.

The brand has expanded its international presence through global fashion retailers including Farfetch, Zalando, Moda Operandi and Peek&Cloppenburg, with products available in more than 80 countries.

During this period she also pursued doctoral studies at Bucharest National University of Arts focusing on sustainability in fashion design.

== Design philosophy ==
Ciolacu’s work is influenced by her background in architecture and frequently explores the relationship between body, structure and movement.

Her collections combine geometric construction with fluid silhouettes and often incorporate experimental textiles and recycled materials.

Sustainability and responsible production are central to the brand’s approach, with projects exploring textile recycling, material experimentation and collaboration with local craftsmanship.

== Media coverage ==
Ciolacu’s work has been featured in international fashion publications including Vogue Portugal, Vogue Ukraine, L’Officiel Elle Magazine, Harper's Bazaar, Solstice Magazine, Pap Magazine, Women's Wear Daily or Cake Magazine.

== Reception and influence ==
Ciolacu’s work has been noted for combining architectural structure with fluid silhouettes and experimental materials.

Fashion editors have highlighted the brand’s focus on sustainability, textile experimentation and contemporary womenswear with sculptural elements.

== Research and academic activity ==
Alongside her fashion practice, Ciolacu has been involved in academic research focusing on sustainability and innovation in fashion design.

She pursued doctoral studies at the Bucharest National University of Arts, where her research explores sustainable production methods and the environmental impact of fashion production.

== Awards ==
Ciolacu has received the following awards and nominations:

- BigSEE Fashion Design Award 2020
- BigSEE Grand Prix Award 2020
- Awarded Best Designer at Romanian Design Week Awards 2018
- Nominated for Best Designer at the 2016 Elle Style Awards
- Awarded Best Designer of the Year at the 2015 Beau Monde Awards
- Awarded Design Award by The One 10 Years of Inspiration
- Awarded Sponsorship Award by 2014 Who's Next The Future of Fashion
- Awarded Best Designer by 2013 Designer for Tomorrow Stella McCartney
- Awarded Best Young Designer 2nd Place 2010 European Fashion Awards

== See also ==
- Sustainable fashion
- London College of Fashion
