= Peter Clayden =

British journalist and author

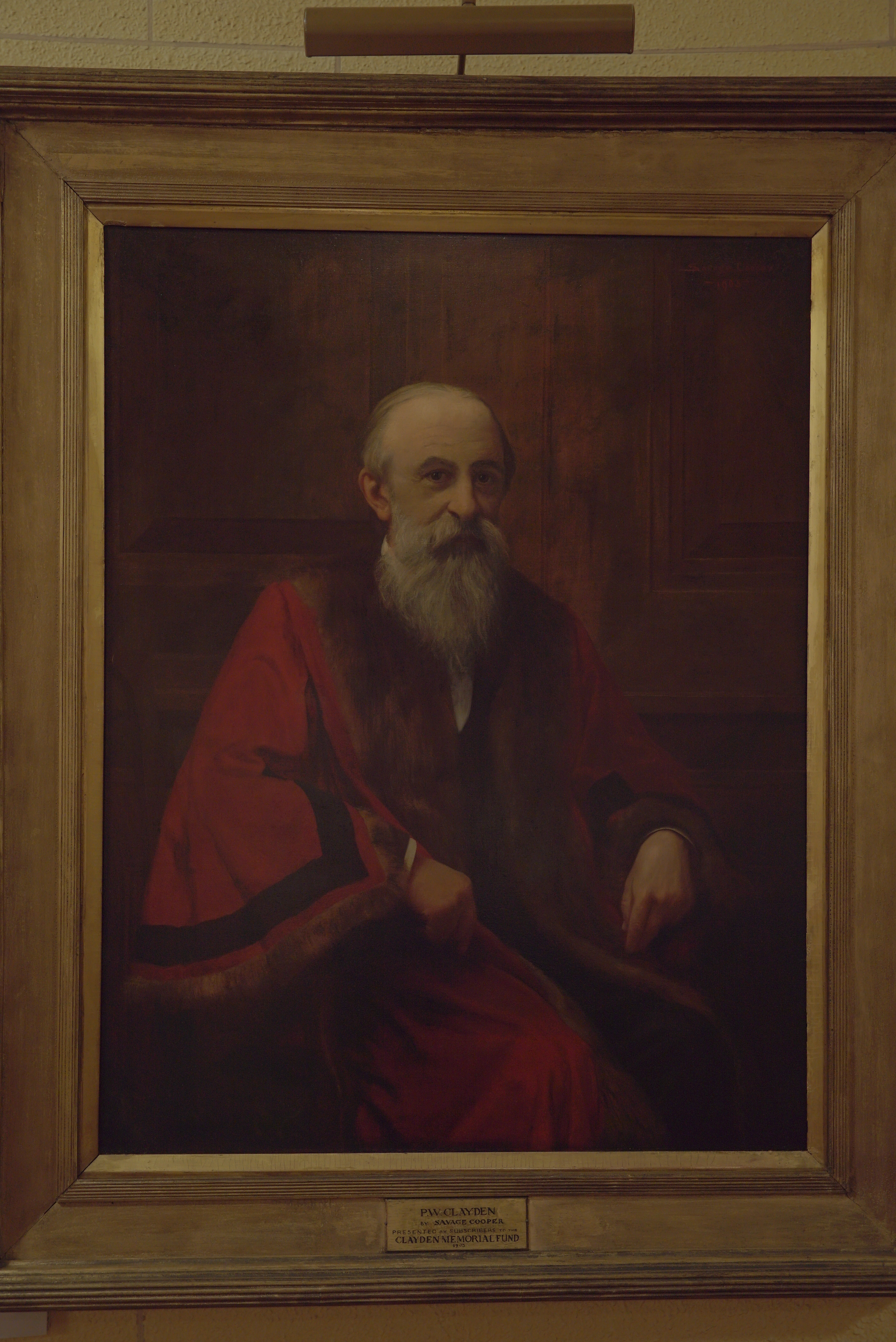

Personal life
- Born: Peter William Clayden; 20 October 1827 Wallingford, Oxfordshire
- Died: 19 February 1902 (aged 74)
- Resting place: Highgate Cemetery
- Spouse: Jane, née Fowle (m. 1853; died 1870) Ellen, née Sharpe (m. 1887)
- Children: Arthur W. Clayden
- Political party: Liberal Party
- Occupation: Minister; journalist; writer
- Relations: Arthur Clayden (brother)

Religious life
- Denomination: Nonconformist
- Writing career
- Genre: Biography; politics and current affairs
- Notable works: England under Lord Beaconsfield (1980); Five Years of Liberal and Six Years of Conservative Government (1880)

Peter William Clayden (20 October 1827 – 19 February 1902) was a British Nonconformist and Liberal journalist and author.

== Career ==
=== Unitarian minister ===
Clayden was a Unitarian minister from 1855 to 1868. He was in charge of Unitarian churches in Boston (1855–9), Rochdale (1859–60), and Nottingham (1860–68).

=== Journalism and writing career ===
Clayden edited the Boston Guardian and wrote on political and social topics for the Edinburgh Review and the Cornhill Magazine. He strongly supported the North in the American Civil War.

In 1866 he started to write for the Daily News, relinquishing his ministry in 1868 to become a member of its regular staff in London as a leader writer and assistant editor. In 1887 he was appointed night editor, which he would hold until 1896. Clayden strongly supported William Ewart Gladstone's anti-Turkish stance over the Eastern Question and chronicled his times from a Liberal perspective in various books.

He wrote (or compiled and edited) biographies of a notable uncle and nephew, Samuel Sharpe, Egyptologist and Translator of the Bible (1883), The Early Life of Samuel Rogers (1887) and Rogers and his Contemporaries (1889), described as "a standard Victorian life-and-letters volume, which is to say that it consists of transcripts of manuscript letters interspersed with connecting biographical material supplied by the editor."

== Personal life ==
Two of Clayden's younger brothers, Arthur Clayden (1829–1899) and Samuel Clayden, settled in New Zealand.

Clayden married firstly to Jane Fowle in 1853. Their eldest son, Arthur W. Clayden was born in 1855 and later became the first principal of Royal Albert Memorial College, now University of Exeter. Following the death of his first wife in 1870, in 1887, Clayden married Ellen Sharpe, great niece of Samuel Rogers, the subject of two of his books.

Clayden was a vegetarian and was treasurer of the Boston Vegetarian Association in 1856. He died on 19 February 1902 and was buried with both his wives on the eastern side of Highgate Cemetery.

== Works ==
- England Under Lord Beaconsfield (C. Kegan Paul & Co, 1880).
- Five Years of Liberal and Six Years of Conservative Government (1880).
- Samuel Sharpe, Egyptologist and translator of the Bible (C. Kegan Paul & Co, 1883)
- The Early Life of Samuel Rogers (Smith, Elder & Co., 1887)
- Rogers and His Contemporaries: Volumes I & II (Smith, Elder & Co., 1889)
- England Under the Coalition, 1885–1892 (T. Fisher Unwin, 1892).
- Armenia: The Case Against Lord Salisbury (1897).
