= Dauvit Broun =

Scottish historian and academic

Professor Dauvit Broun FRSE FBA

Personal details
- Born: 1961 (age 64–65)
- Occupation: Historian

Dauvit Broun (born 1961) is a Scottish historian and academic. He is the chair of Scottish history at the University of Glasgow. A specialist in medieval Scottish and Celtic studies, he concentrates primarily on early medieval Scotland, and has written abundantly on the topic of early Scottish king-lists, as well as on literacy, charter-writing, national identity, and on the text known as de Situ Albanie.

He is editor of the New Edinburgh History of Scotland series, the pre-1603 editor of the Scottish Historical Review, convener of the Scottish History Society, and the Principal Investigator of the Arts and Humanities Research Council-funded project 'The Paradox of Medieval Scotland, 1093–1286'.

== Honours ==
Broun was elected a Fellow of the Royal Society of Edinburgh in 2013. In July 2017, Broun was elected a Fellow of the British Academy (FBA), the United Kingdom's national academy for the humanities and social sciences. In 2013 he delivered the British Academy's Sir John Rhys Memorial Lecture.

Academic offices
Preceded by Professor Ted Cowan	Professor of Scottish History and Literature, Glasgow; 2009–Present	Succeeded by Incumbent
