= Rhind Lectures =

Rhind Lectures are a series of lectures on ‘some branch of archaeology, ethnology, ethnography, or allied topic’ in order ‘to assist in the general advancement of knowledge’. They have been hosted by the Society of Antiquaries of Scotland since 1876. The content of the lectures is usually published in journals or expanded into new works by their authors.

The name commemorates Alexander Henry Rhind, whose bequest to the society funded this lectureship. Rhind directed that his estate be used for this purpose, once the interests of living parties were extinguished, which took place 11 years after his death in 1863. The speaker and subject are selected some three years in advance, allowing the speaker to give a detailed exposition of a topic in their area of expertise.

The Rhind Lectures have continued into the 21st century, and since 2009 the society has published a video file that is freely available to the public.

== Lecturers 1876–2008 ==
The total number of lectures in the series in 2012 was 133. The following is a list of all lecturers to 2012, with the title of their lectures where known.

Rhind Lectures
No.	Year(s)	Title	Lecturer
1	1874/76	The past in the Present	Arthur Mitchell, MD, LLD
2	1876/78	The past in the Present	Arthur Mitchell, MD., LLD
3	1879	Scotland in Early Christian Times	Joseph Anderson
4	1880	Scotland in Early Christian Times	Joseph Anderson
5	1881	Scotland in Pagan Times: The Iron Age	Joseph Anderson
6	1882	Scotland in Pagan Times: The Bronze and Stone Ages	Joseph Anderson
7	1883	The Roman Occupation of Britain	Rev J Collingwood Bruce, LLD, FSA
8	1884	Ogham inscriptions in Ireland and Scotland	Sir Samuel Ferguson, QC., LLD., President of the Royal Irish Academy
9	1885	Early Christian symbolism in Great Britain and Ireland	J Romilly Allen, CE
10	1886	Register of Privy Council of Scotland	David Masson, MA LLD., Professor of Rhetoric & English Literature, University of Edinburgh
11	1887	Greek Antiquities	Alexander Stuart Murray, LLD., Keeper of Greek and Roman Antiquities, British Museum, London
12	1888	The Lake Dwellings of Europe	Robert Munro, MA MD., Author of Ancient Scottish Lake Dwellings
13	1889	Early Ethnology of the British Isles	John Rhys, MA, Professor of Celtic at Oxford
14	1890	Archaeological Aspects of Scottish Zoology	Professor J. Duns, DD., New College, Edinburgh
15	1891	The Anthropological History of Europe	John Beddoe, MD LLD FRS, Vice-President of the Anthropological Institute of Great Britain and Ireland
16	1892	The Early Christian Monuments of Scotland	Joseph Anderson, LLD., Assistant Secretary and Keeper of the Scottish National Museum of Antiquities, Edinburgh
17	1893	The Place-names of Scotland	Sir Herbert Maxwell, 7th Baronet
18	1894	Early fortifications in Scotland	David Christison, MD
19	1895	The Origins of Celtic Art	Arthur Evans, MA., Keeper of the Ashmolean Museum, Oxford
20	1896	Industrial arts of Scandinavia in pagan times	Dr Hans Hildebrand, Royal Antiquary of Sweden
21	1897	The Evidence for a Roman Occupation of North Britain	James MacDonald, LLD
22	1898	Heraldry	James Balfour Paul, Lyon King-of-Arms
23	1899	Architecture in Scotland	Thomas Ross

24 1900 The Edwards in Scotland, 1296–1377 Joseph Bain, FSA Scot

25 1901 The Constitution, Organisation, and Law of the Mediaeval Church in Scotland Bishop Dowden

26 1902 Castellated architecture of Scotland Thomas Ross

27 1903 Scotland in the Time of Queen Mary P Hume Brown, MA LLD., Fraser Professor of Ancient (Scottish) History and Palaeography in the University of Edinburgh

28 1904 Roman Scotland George Macdonald, MA

29 1905 Roman Britain Dr F Haverfield, MA LLD

30 1906 The Archaeology of the Cuneiform Inscriptions Professor Archibald Sayce

31 1907 Roman Britain Dr F Haverfield, MA LLD

32 1908 The Roman Station at Newstead Mr James Curle

33 1909 The Occupation and use of the land in Scotland in Early Times Dr David Murray

34 1910 Art of the Period of the Teutonic Migrations Professor Gerard Baldwin Brown

35 1911 The Records of Scotland J Maitland Thomson, LLD

36 1912 The Early Chronicles relating to Scotland Rt Hon Sir Herbert Maxwell, Bart., President of the Society

37 1913 Some aspects of Scottish Feudalism Dr George Neilson

38 1913 The Development of writing and printing in Western Europe Dr W K Dickson

39 1914 The Liturgy and Ceremonial of The Mediaeval Church in Scotland Mr F C Eeles

40 1915 Medals of the Renaissance Mr George Francis Hill, Keeper of Coins & Medals, British Museum

41 1916 Celtic Place-Names in Scotland Professor W J Watson, LLD

42 1917 Arms and Armour Mr Charles J. ffoulkes, Curator of the Royal Armouries, Tower of London

43 1918 The Prehistoric Monuments of Scotland Mr A O Curle

44 1919 House Furnishing and Domestic Life in Scotland 1488–1688 Mr John Warrack

45 1920 Painting in the Roman Empire (from the last century of the Republic to about 800 AD) Mrs Arthur (Eugénie) Strong, British School at Rome

46 1921 Egyptian Science Professor W M Flinders Petrie

47 1922 Monastic Building in Britain Mr C R Peers

48 1923 The Civilisation of Greece in the Bronze Age Dr H R Hall

49 1924 Early Races of Scotland Professor Thomas H Bryce

50 1925 The Mediaeval Castle in Scotland Mr W M Mackenzie, Secretary RCAHMS

51 1926 Italian Sculpture of the Renaissance Mr Eric Maclagan, director, V & A Museum

52 1927 Roman Britain Sir George Macdonald, KCB FBA LLD

53 1928 The Ancient Connections between Scotland and Norway Professor A W Brøgger

54 1929 The History of the Brooch Mr Reginald A Smith, BA FSA

55 1930 The Hittites Professor Garstang

56 1931 Monastic Life and its influence on the Civilisation of Scotland Mr George Gordon Coulton, Litt D DLitt LLD FBA

57 1932 The Megalithic Culture of Northern Europe Dr C A Nordman, Helsingfors

58 1933 English Illumination from AD 700 to the end of the Fifteenth Century Mr Eric G Millar, DLitt

59 1934 Augustan Civilisation in Western Europe Mr Ian A Richmond

60 1935 Early Anglo Saxon Art and Archaeology Mr E T Leeds, Keeper of the Ashmolean Museum

61 1936 The Archaeology of the Iberian Peninsula Professor P Bosch Gimpera

62 1937 Mediaeval Edinburgh Dr C A Malcolm

63 1938 Excavations at Ras Shamra Monsieur Claude Shaeffer

64 1939 Early Art of Scandinavia Professor Haakon Shetelig

1940 Postponed (delivered in April 1942)

65 1941 The Province of Mar Dr W Douglas Simpson

66 1942 Jurisdictions of Mediaeval Scotland Dr W C Dickinson

67 1943 The Topography of Roman Scotland Mr O G S Crawford, FSA

68 1944 The Development of Tribal Society in Scotland Professor V G Childe, DLitt DSc FBA V-PSA

69 1945 The Scottish Burghs Dr W Mackay Mackenzie

70 1946 Spring Scandinavian Art of the Post-Christian Pagan Period Professor Haakon Shetelig

71 1946 Oct Castles and Cannon: A Study of Early Artillery Fortifications in England Mr Bryan H St John O’Neil

1947 No lecture

72 1948 Early Christian Monuments in the Near East Professor W M Calder, LLD

73 1949 First: The Mediaeval Stone Carver in Scotland (Two series of lectures delivered) Mr James S Richardson, LLD

74 Second: Regional House-Styles: their origins and development: recent studies in South Wales Sir Cyril Fox, DLitt FSA

75 1950 (Series of seven lectures) Periods of Highland Civilization Miss I F Grant LLD

76 1951 Discipline of Field Archaeology Professor R E Mortimer Wheeler

77 1952 Greek Sculpture: The Century after Pheidias Mr Bernard Ashmole, MC MA BLitt FBA

78 1953 Architecture in Elizabethan England Mr John Summerson, CBE FSA ARIBA

79 1954 The Laboratory in the service of Art and Archaeology Dr H J Plenderleith

80 1955 A Survey of American Archaeology Dr G H S Bushnell

81 1956 Classical inspiration in Medieval Art Mr W F Oakenshott

1957 No lecture due to the death of Professor S P O’Riordain

82 1958 The Historical Local Institutions of Scotland Professor G S Pryde of Glasgow

83 1959 The Role of Constantinople in Byzantine Art Professor D Talbot Rice

84 1960 Roman Imperial Art Mr J B Ward Perkins, Director of The British School at Rome

85 1961 The Origins of the Late Celtic Art Professor Haseloff of Würzburg

86 1962 March Mounds of the Middle East: their formation and excavation Mr Seton Lloyd, CBE

87 Nov The Prehistoric Origins of Europe Professor Stuart Piggott, BLitt DLitt HUM

88 1964 The Coins of the Ancient Celts Mr D F Allen, BA FBA FSA

89 1965 March Anglo-Saxon Pottery and the Settlement of England Mr J N L Myres, MA LLD FSA

90 Oct Cultural Structure and Movement in East Asia from the Neolithic Period to the Unification of China Mr William Watson, MA

91 1966/67 Scottish Architects and English Architecture in the 18th Century Dr PJ Murray

92 1967/68 Late Medieval Monumental Sculpture in the West Highlands Dr K A Steer

93 1968/69 The Roman Frontier in Germany in the Light of New Research Prof Dr Hans Schonberger

94 1969/70 The Furnishing of Medieval Churches in Scotland The Rt Rev Monsigneur D McRoberts S.T.L.

95 1970/71 Plough and Field shape from Prehistoric Times to c1500 AD Prof Axel Steensberg

96 1972/73 Byzantine Mosaic and Wall Paintings D Winfield

97 1973/74 Aspects of Archaeology in Iran D B Stronach

98 1974/75 Scottish Silversmiths and Their Work Stuart Maxwell

99 1975/76 Interior Decoration in Great Britain G Beard

100 1976/77 Pictish Art and Society Dr I Henderson

101 1977/78 Pre-Roman Celtic Art Prof O-H Frey

102 1978/79 The Medieval Cathedrals of Scotland Dr R Cant

103 1979/80 The Course of Architecture in Ireland Dr M Craig

104 1980/81 The Industrial Heritage Prof S G E Lythe

105 1981/82 Pre-Roman and Native Settlement between the Tyne and Forth Prof G Jobey

106 1982/83 Aspects of the Neolithic and Early Bronze Age in the Netherlands and Britain Prof JD van der Waals

107 1983/84 The Danube Frontier of the Roman Empire Prof J J Wilkes

1985/86 108 1986/87 Culture, Tradition and Artifact Dr A Gailey

109 1987/88 The Archaeology of Death in Ancient Egypt Dr A Rosalie Davie

110 1988/89 An Heroic Age: War and Society in Northern Britain AD 450–850 Prof Leslie Alcock

111 1989/90 The Archaeology of the Slavs Dr Martin Gojda

112 1990/91 The Revival of Medieval and Early Renaissance Architecture in Scotland 1745–1930 Dr D M Walker

113 1991/92 Altering The Earth: The Origins of Monuments in Britain and Continental Europe Prof R Bradley

114 1992/93 Scottish Monastic life on the Eve of the Reformation Dr Mark Dilworth

115 1993/94 Oral Narrative in Scotland Donald A MacDonald

116 1994/95 Enlarging the Past: the contribution of Wetland Archaeology Professor John and Dr Bryony Coles

117 1995/96 Death and Wealth in Viking Scotland Professor James Graham-Campbell

118 1996/97 The Food of the Scots Professor Alexander Fenton

119 1997/98 Scottish Royal Palaces: The Architecture of the Royal Residences during the Late Medieval and Early Renaissance Periods John Dunbar

120 1998/99 The Origins of Insular Monasticism Professor Charles Thomas

121 1999–2000 Significant Figures: Anderson, Baldwin-Brown, Childe, AO Curle, J Curle, A McBain, L Mann, WF Skene Dr D J Breeze; Dr DV Clarke; Professor D Meek; Dr JNG Ritchie; Mr WDH Sellar

122 2000–2001 Art as Archaeology, Archaeology as Art: Transformations through material culture Professor Colin Renfrew, Baron Renfrew of Kaimsthorn, University of Cambridge

123 2001–2002 Peoples Between The Oceans Professor Barry Cunliffe, University of Oxford

124 2002–2003 Lines from the past: towards an anthropological archaeology of inscription Professor Tim Ingold, University of Aberdeen

125 2003–2004 Court, Capital and Country: the Emergence of Renaissance Scotland Professor Michael Lynch, University of Edinburgh

126 2004–2005 Men who turned towards the light: Cult and creativity in the Romans’ world Professor Greg Woolf, University of St Andrews

127 2006 Rock and Cave Art Paul Bahn

128 2007 Living in an Age of Stone: Neolithic people and their worlds Professor Gabriel Cooney, University College Dublin

129 2008 Archaeology and the Sea in Scandinavia and Britain Professor Ole Crumlin-Pedersen, Denmark

== Lecturers 2009- ==
130 2009 New Light on the Dawn: a new perspective on the Neolithic Revolution in Southwest Asia Emeritus Professor Trevor Watkins, University of Edinburgh

131 2010 Design versus Dogma: Reflections on Field Archaeology Professor Martin Carver, University of York

132 2011 Material and spiritual engagements; Britain and Ireland in the first age of metal Dr Stuart Needham

133 2012 On the windy edge of nothing: Vikings in the North Atlantic world – ecological and social journeys Professor Kevin Edwards, University of Aberdeen

134 2013 ‘Magnificent for the beauty and extent of its buildings and worthy of everlasting fame’: the architecture of the Scottish late medieval Church, by Richard Fawcett of University of St Andrews (2013).

135 2014 Archaeology and Celtic Myth – an exploration Professor John Waddell, NUI Galway

136 2015 British Archaeology: its progress and demands Various contributors including, Professor Audrey Horning, Queen’s University Belfast; Professor Ian Baxter, University Campus Suffolk; Dr Jacqui Mulville, Cardiff University; Margaret Maitland, National Museums Scotland; Dr Rebecca Jones, Historic Environment Scotland; Dr Alan Leslie, Northlight Heritage; Professor Mary Bownes, University of Edinburgh; Professor Keith Dobney, University of Aberdeen; Dr Greger Larson, University of Oxford; Dr Eva-Maria Geigl, CNRS University Paris 7; Professor Ian Barnes, Natural History Museum; and Professor Richard Bradley

137 2016 Antiquaries, archaeologists and the invention of the historic town c.1700–1860 Professor Roey Sweet, University of Leicester, Centre for Urban History

138 2017 Sacred Heritage: medieval monasticism, magic and memory Professor Roberta Gilchrist, University of Reading

139 2018 Drystone technologies: Neolithic tensions and Iron Age compressions Dr John Barber, AOC Archaeology Group

140 2019 Hadrian’s Wall: A Study in Archaeological Exploration and Interpretation Professor David J. Breeze

141 2020 Neolithic Scotland: the Big Picture and Detailed Narratives in 2020 Dr Alison Sheridan

142 2021 Untimely Ends Professor John Hunter

143 2022 Unearthing the African Diaspora Professor Theresa Singleton

144 2023 What has Maya archaeology done for us? Professor Elizabeth Graham

145 2024 Two ‘little’ ice ages and an anomaly: climate, environment and cultural change in medieval and early modern Scotland Professor Richard Oram
