= Jacqui Mulville =

Field archaeologist and academic

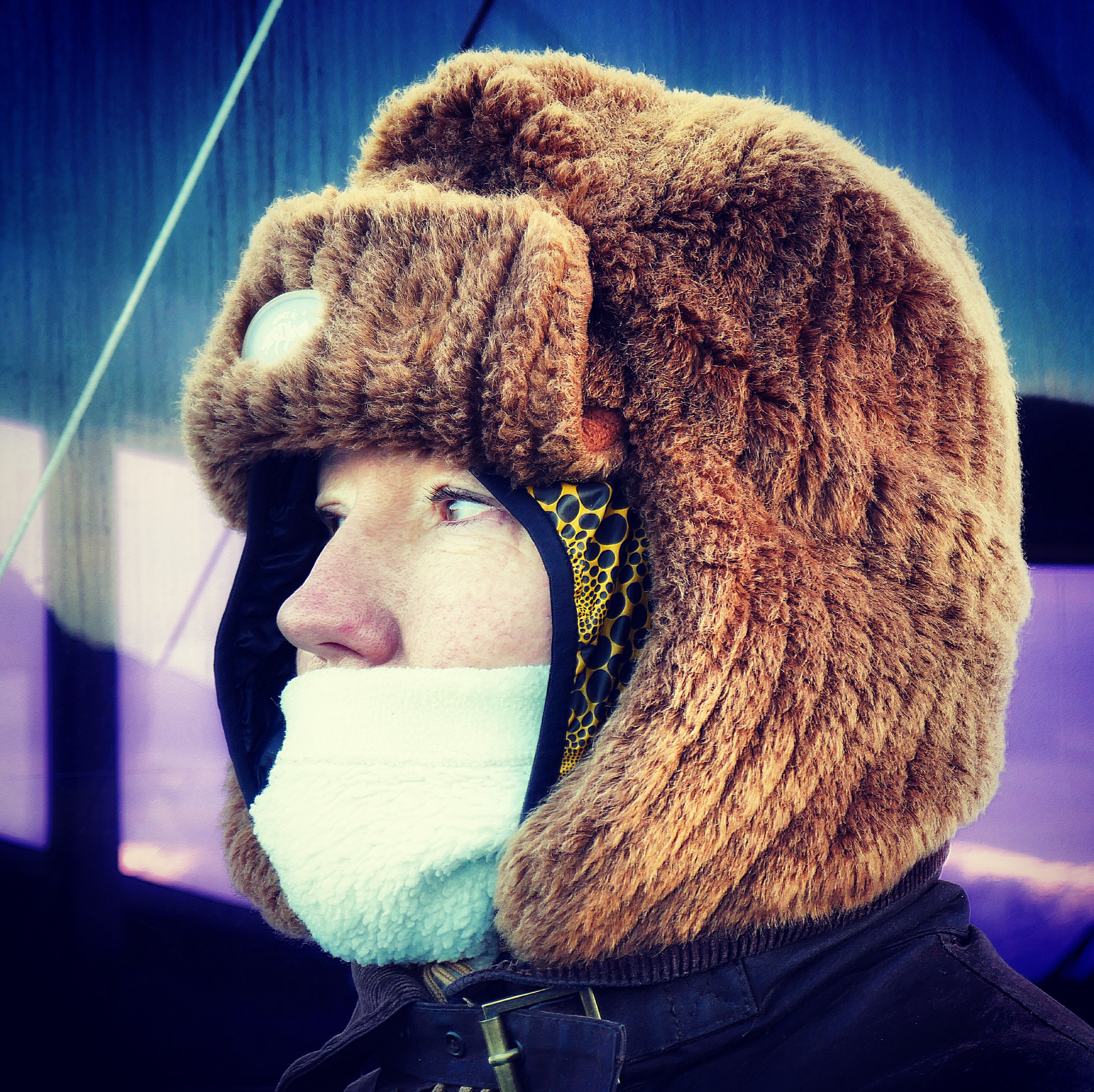
Professor Jacqui Mulville, Norway 2018

Jacqueline Mulville is a British bioarchaeologist and professor of archaeology at Cardiff University. Mulville is a field archaeologist whose research focuses on osteoarchaeology, human and animal identities, and island archaeologies concentrated on Britain.

== Education and career ==
Archaeology was not the initial career choice of Mulville, who undertook a BSc in biology at Imperial College London.

Volunteer work, however, marked the start of her career in archaeology, and she worked as a field archaeologist for English Heritage on sites including Beeston Castle, and as a research assistant for English Heritage at the University of Cambridge examining evidence from Roman and later periods from Chelmsford (Caesaromagus) and Colchester (Camulodonum).

She undertook a PhD at the University of Sheffield, under the supervision of Paul Halstead, being awarded a doctorate in 1995 for her thesis 'Milking, Herd Structure, and Bone Chemistry: An Evaluation of Archaeozoological Methods for the Recognition of Dairying'. This analysed the identification of milking, using domestic dairy cattle and St Kilda Soay Sheep as study populations.

Mulville then worked for the West Yorkshire Archaeology Service, recording material from West Heslerton, and as a commercial archaeologist at the University of Sheffield, before returning to English Heritage at Birmingham University to analyse a medieval assemblage from Castle Mall Norwich. At Southampton University she was a research assistant for English Heritage, examining Saxon and Neolithic sites. Mulville excavated at South Uist in the Outer Hebrides, and was a co-director of excavations at Cladh Hallan. This investigated the only two bodies known to have been mummified among the early tribes of Europe, although Mulville suggested the practice may have been more common than we know, and said that the finds at Cladh Hallan raised more questions than they answered.

Mulville became a senior research fellow at the University of Oxford, working sites including Glaston and Fiskerton. After this she taught briefly at University College Winchester before moving in 2002 to Cardiff University where she replaced Professor John Evans on his retirement.

She founded Guerilla Archaeology, a Cardiff-based outreach organisation of archaeologists, scientists and artists.

== Awards ==
Mulville is a fellow of the Society of Antiquaries of Scotland, where she gave one of the 2015 Rhind Lectures, on "Storytelling".

== Bibliography ==
=== Books ===
- The Zooarchaeology of Fats, Oils, Milk and Dairying, International Council for Archaeozoology, ed. by J. Mulville and A. K. Outram (Oxford: Oxbow, 2005)
- A Study of the Historic Coastal and Marine Environment of the Isles of Scilly. Cornwall Archaeological Unit, Cornwall Council, ed. by D. Charman et al. (Cornwall: Cornwall Archaeological Unit, Cornwall Council, 2015)
- Norwich Castle: Excavations and Historical Surveys 1987-98, Part III: a Zooarchaeological Study, ed. by U. Albarella et al., East Anglian Archaeology Occasional Paper, Vol. 22. (Oxford: East Anglian Archaeology, 2009)

=== Articles ===
- With J. Jones, 'Norse animal husbandry in liminal environments: stable isotope evidence from the Scottish North Atlantic Islands'. Environmental Archaeology (2018)
- With S. Walden, 'An analysis of systematic elemental changes in decomposing bone'. Journal of Forensic Sciences 63 (1) 2018, pp. 207–213
- With K. Twiss et al., 'Horses, hemiones, hydruntines? assessing the reliability of dental criteria for assigning species to Southwest Asian equid remains'. International Journal of Osteoarchaeology 27 (2) 2017, pp. 298–304
- With S. J. Walden, and S. L. Evans, 'Changes in Vickers hardness during the decomposition of bone: possibilities for forensic anthropology'. Journal of the Mechanical Behaviour of Biomedical Materials 65 (2017), pp. 672–678
- With D. W. G. Stanton and M. W. Bruford, 'Colonization of the Scottish islands via long-distance Neolithic transport of red deer (Cervus elaphus). Proceedings of the Royal Society B: Biological Sciences 2016, 283 (1828)
- With J. Best, 'Birds from the water: reconstructing avian resource use and contribution to diet in prehistoric Scottish Island environments'. Journal of Archaeological Science: Reports 6 (2016) pp. 654–664
- With S. Evans et al., 'Using combined biomolecular methods to explore whale exploitation and social aggregation in hunter-gatherer-fisher society in Tierra del Fueg'. Journal of Archaeological Science: Reports 6 (2016) pp. 757–767
- With J. Jones, 'Isotopic and zooarchaeological approaches towards understanding aquatic resource use in human economies and animal management in the prehistoric Scottish North Atlantic Islands'. Journal of Archaeological Science: Reports 6 (2015) pp. 665–677
- With R. Madgwick, 'Feasting on fore-limbs: conspicuous consumption and identity in later prehistoric Britain'. Antiquity 89 (345) (2015) pp. 629–644.
- With R. Madgwick, 'Reconstructing depositional histories through bone taphonomy: extending the potential of faunal data'. Journal of Archaeological Science 53 (2015) pp. 255–263
- With C. Richards et al., 'Containment, closure and red deer: a Late Neolithic butchery site at Skaill Bay, Mainland, Orkney'. Proceedings of the Society of Antiquaries of Scotland 145 (2015) pp. 91–124
- With B. Arbuckle, 'Data sharing reveals complexity in the westward spread of domestic animals across Neolithic Turkey'. PLOS One 9 (6) 2014
- With L. Cramp et al., 'Immediate replacement of fishing with dairying by the earliest farmers of the northeast Atlantic archipelagos'. Proceedings of the Royal Society B: Biological Sciences 281(1780) 2014
- With M. Buckley et al., 'Species identification of archaeological marine mammals using collagen fingerprinting'. Journal of Archaeological Science 41 (2014) pp. 631–641
- With J. Best, 'A bird in the hand: Data collation and novel analysis of avian remains from South Uist, Outer Hebrides'. International Journal of Osteoarchaeology 24 (3) 2013, pp. 384–396.
