= Hector Hetherington =

British academic (1888–1965)

Sir Hector Hetherington GBE DL
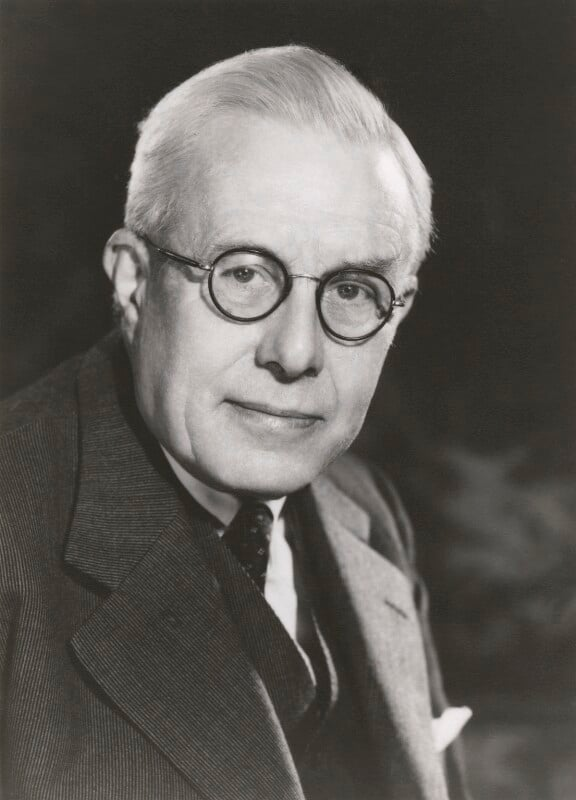
- Portrait taken by Walter Bird, c. 1958

Principal of the University of Glasgow
- In office 1936–1961
- Preceded by: Sir Robert Sangster Rait
- Succeeded by: Sir Charles Wilson

Vice-Chancellor of the University of Liverpool
- In office 1927–1936
- Preceded by: John George Adami
- Succeeded by: John Leofric Stocks

Principal of University College of the South West of England
- In office 1920–1924
- Preceded by: Arthur W. Clayden
- Succeeded by: Walter Hamilton Moberly

Personal details
- Born: Hector James Wright Hetherington; 21 July 1888 Cowdenbeath, Fife, Scotland
- Died: 15 January 1965 (aged 76)
- Resting place: Tillicoultry
- Spouse(s): Mary Ethel Alison Reid, Lady Hetherington
- Children: Scott Hetherington; Alastair Hetherington
- Education: University of Glasgow; Merton College, Oxford

Academic background
- Academic advisors: Sir Henry Jones; Harold H. Joachim

Academic work
- Discipline: Philosophy
- Sub-discipline: Moral philosophy
- Institutions: University of Glasgow; University of Sheffield; University College, Cardiff; University College of the South West of England

Sir Hector James Wright Hetherington GBE DL (21 July 1888 – 15 January 1965) was a Scottish philosopher, who was Vice-Chancellor of the University of Liverpool from 1927 to 1936, and Principal of the University of Glasgow until 1961.

== Early life ==
Hetherington was born in Cowdenbeath, Fife, and educated at Dollar Academy where he was school dux 1904 and 1905.

He studied at the University of Glasgow and at Merton College, Oxford.

== Career ==
He was appointed Lecturer in Moral Philosophy at Glasgow in 1910, and Lecturer in Philosophy at the University of Sheffield in 1914, before becoming Professor of Logic and Philosophy at University College Cardiff (now Cardiff University) in 1915. He worked in the Secretariat of the 1919 International Labour Conference of the League of Nations in Washington, D.C.

In 1920, he moved to Royal Albert Memorial College (now University of Exeter) as Professor of Philosophy and Principal of the College. During his tenure as principal, Hetherington successfully persuaded the University Grant Committee to provide funding for the institution, which was subsequently renamed, University College of the South West of England.

He returned to Glasgow in 1924 as Professor of Moral Philosophy. In 1927, he became Vice-Chancellor of the University of Liverpool, but returned to Glasgow again in 1936, as Principal and Vice-Chancellor of the University. He served in this position for twenty-five years, retiring in 1961.

He served as a Trustee of the Carnegie United Kingdom Trust and, ex officio, of the Carnegie Trust for the Universities of Scotland from 1936 until 1961. He was a Trustee of the Nuffield Foundation from 1943 until his death, serving as Vice-Chairman from 1961.

In 1942, he visited the US as a British visiting adviser to American universities on wartime academic policy. In 1943 he became Chairman of the Committee of British Vice-Chancellors and remained as Chairman or Deputy Chairman until 1952.

As a member of the Award Committee of the Commonwealth Fund he travelled widely, particularly in the United States and Canada, to promote links between British Universities and those in other countries. He received honorary degrees from 13 universities in the UK and North America. From 1930 to 1932 he was a member of the Royal Commission on Unemployment Insurance and in 1938 was appointed as Chairman of the Royal Commission on Workmen's Compensation.

From 1940 to 1948, he was a member of the National Arbitration Tribunal and from 1951 to 1959 he was a member of the Industrial Disputes Tribunal.

== Personal life ==
Hetherington married Mary Ethel Alison Reid (1886–1966) in 1914, with whom he had two sons. The elder son, Scott, became a senior civil servant in the Scottish Office, while the younger son, Alastair, went on to become editor of The Guardian. He retired in 1961 to Edinburgh.

He was a member of the Athenæum, the Royal Scottish Automobile Club and Glasgow Golf Club. He was knighted in the 1936 New Years Honours List, and appointed Knight Commander of the Order of the British Empire (KBE) in the 1948 King's Birthday Honours List and Knight Grand Cross of the Order of the British Empire (GBE) in the 1962 New Years Honours List.

He served as a Deputy Lieutenant (DL) for the County of Glasgow, and was made a Freeman of the City of Glasgow in 1961.

He is buried in a simple grave with his wife in the cemetery in Tillicoultry, just south-east of the war memorial. His younger son, Alastair, is buried beside them.

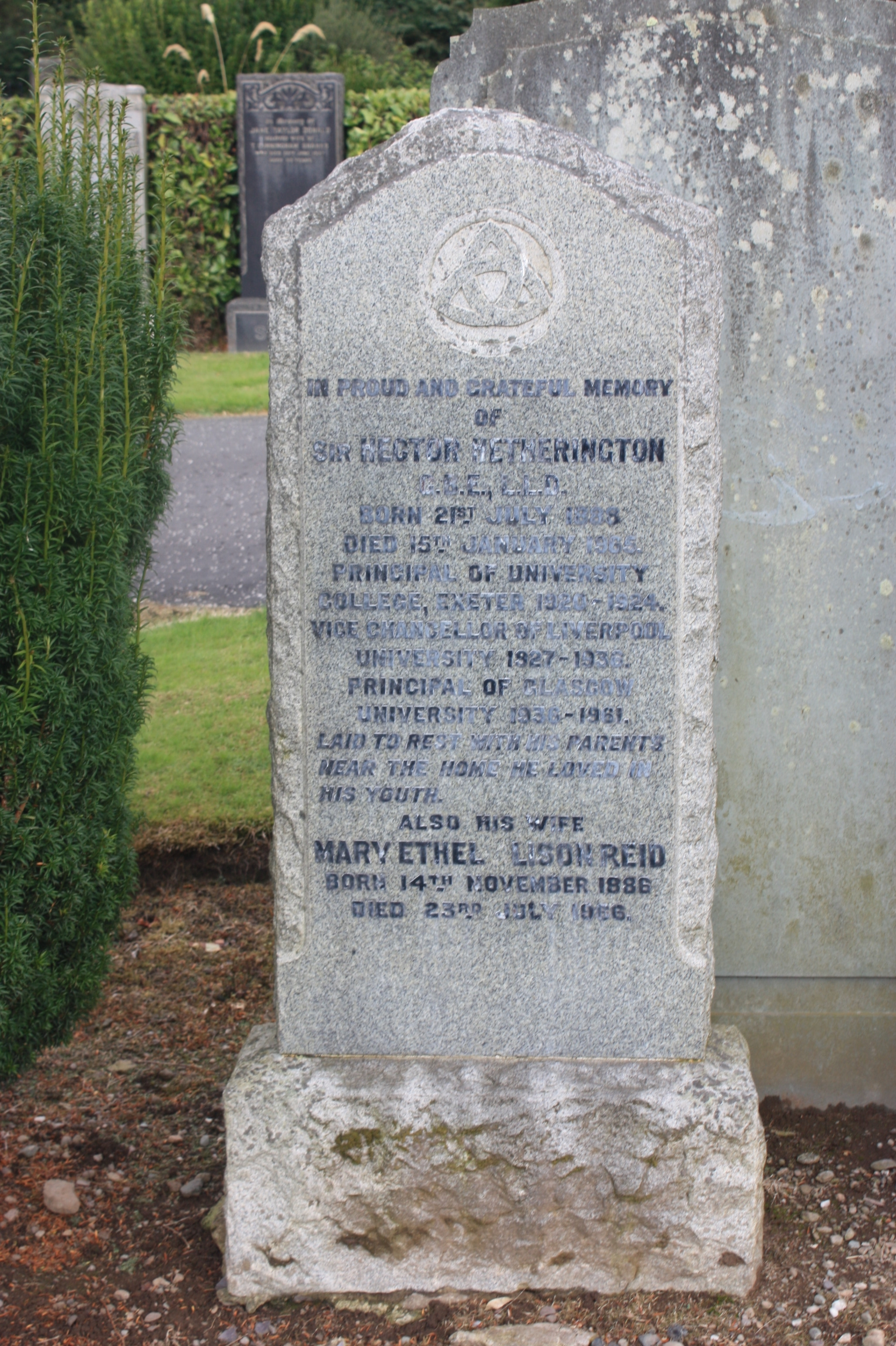
Sir Hector Hetherington's grave, Tillicoultry

== Legacy and commemoration ==
University of Glasgow named the building that housed its former research club “Hetherington House”. However, due to financial difficulties, the club was forced to close, leading to the 2011 Hetherington House Occupation - organised by students who opposed the closure as well as proposed cuts and redundancies at the university. On Glasgow’s campus, there is also another building called Hetherington Building, which has teaching spaces.

== Published works ==
- With J. H. Muirhead. Social Purpose. George Allen & Unwin, 1918.
- The Life and Letters of Sir Henry Jones. Hodder and Stoughton. 1924.
- Letters to Graduates 1946-61. University of Glasgow. 1965.

Academic offices
Preceded by Arthur W. Clayden	Principal of the University College of the South West; 1920–1924	Succeeded by Walter Moberly
Preceded by John George Adami	Vice-Chancellor of the University of Liverpool; 1927–1936	Succeeded by John Leofric Stocks
Preceded by Professor Sir Robert Sangster Rait	Principal and Vice-Chancellor of the University of Glasgow; 1936–1961	Succeeded by Sir Charles Wilson
