= George Brodie (historian) =

Scottish lawyer and historian (c. 1786-1867)

- Born: 6 September 1785; East Lothian, Scotland
- Died: 22 January 1867 (aged 81); London, England
- Citizenship: British

Academic background
- Education: Edinburgh High School, University of Edinburgh

Academic work
- Discipline: History, Law
- Main interests: British history, Constitutional history, Scottish law
- Notable works: *History of the British Empire from the Accession of Charles the First to the Restoration* (1822; 2nd ed. titled *A Constitutional History of the British Empire*, 1866)

Notes
- Historiographer Royal for Scotland (1836–1867)

George Brodie (1786?–1867) was a Scottish lawyer and historian.

== Life ==
Brodie was born on 6 September 1785 in East Lothian, where his father was a farmer on a large scale, and a contributor to the improvement of Scottish husbandry. Educated at Edinburgh High School and the University of Edinburgh, he became in 1811 a member of the Faculty of Advocates. He seems to have done little at the bar.

He was an ardent whig, and his political creed partly inspired the one work by which he is known, his History of the British Empire. In the Scottish agitation for the first Reform Bill, Brodie presided at a very numerous gathering of the working-men of Edinburgh held on Arthur's Seat in November 1831 against the rejection of the bill by the peers. In 1836 he was appointed historiographer of Scotland, with a salary of £180 a year.

Brodie died in London on 22 January 1867.

== Works ==
Brodie's major work was History of the British Empire from the accession of Charles the First to the Restoration, with an introduction tracing the progress of society and of the Constitution from the feudal times to the opening of the history, and including a particular examination of Mr. Hume's statements relative to the character of the English government. The 'statements' which Brodie undertook to refute were chiefly those in which David Hume found precedents for the claims of the Stuarts in the action of the Tudor sovereigns. Brodie's history was by far the most elaborate assault on the Stuarts and their apologists, especially Hume and Clarendon, and the most thoroughgoing vindication of the puritans, that had then appeared. It was not of high historical value. It was reviewed in the 'Edinburgh Review' for March 1824, probably by John Allen of Holland House celebrity (see Lord Jeffrey's letter to him in Lord Cockburn's Life of Jeffrey, 2nd ed. 1852, ii. 217). While generally laudatory, the reviewer censured Brodie's indiscriminating partisanship. Guizot has expressed his surprise that so passionate a partisan should have written with so little animation (Preface to the Histoire de la Revolution d'Angleterre, 4th ed. 1860, i. 15). In 1866 appeared a second edition of his History, with the original title slightly expanded into A Constitutional History of the British Empire.

Besides the History, Brodie published an edition of Stair's Institutes of the Law of Scotland, with commentaries and a supplement as to mercantile law. Lord Cockburn says of it and him (Journal, 1874, ii. 113): "His edition of Stair is a deep and difficult legal book. His style is bad, and his method not good.'"

Brodie was also author of a pamphlet entitled Strictures on the Appellate Jurisdiction of the House of Lords, 1856.
