= London College of Fashion =

College of the University of the Arts, London

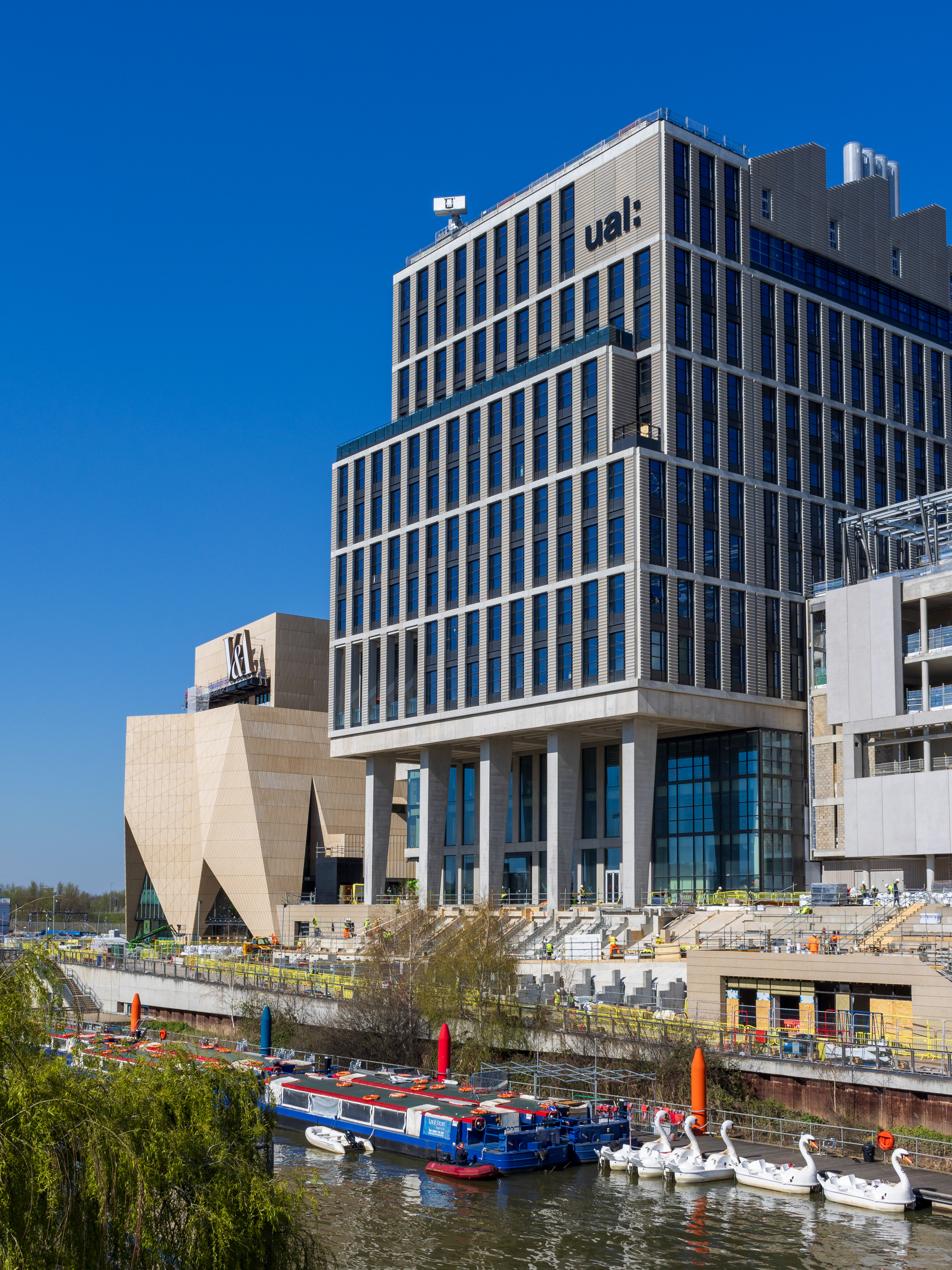
- London College of Fashion building in Stratford
- Established: 1877 – Leather Trade School; 1906 – Shoreditch Technical Institute Girls School; c. 1913 – Cordwainers Technical College; 1915 – Barrett Street Trade School; 1927 – Clapham Trade School; 1967 – London College for the Garment Trades; 1974 – London College of Fashion
- Affiliations: University of the Arts London
- Head: Andrew Teverson
- Location: London, United Kingdom; 51.5418°N 0.01287°W
- Website: arts.ac.uk/fashion
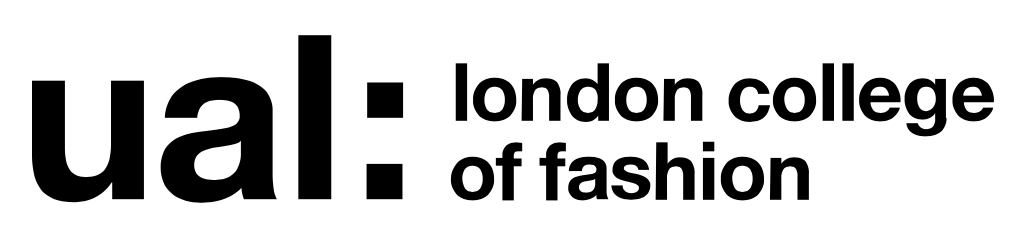

The London College of Fashion is a constituent college of the University of the Arts London, a public art university in London, England. The college offers undergraduate and postgraduate study, short courses, study-abroad courses and business training in fashion and related topics. The patron is Sophie, Duchess of Edinburgh. The current head of college is Professor Andrew Teverson.

== History ==
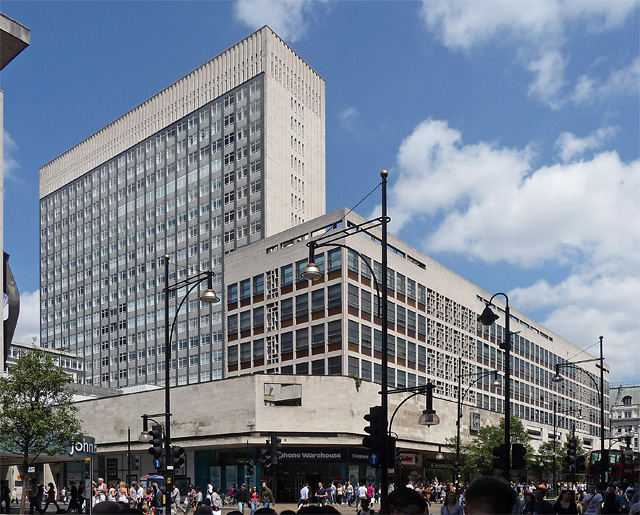
The former John Prince's Street main building

The origins of the London College of Fashion are in three early London trade schools for women: the Shoreditch Technical Institute Girls School, founded in 1906; the Barrett Street Trade School, founded in 1915; and the Clapham Trade School, founded in 1927. All were set up by the technical education board of the London County Council to train skilled labour for trades including dressmaking, millinery, embroidery, women's tailoring and hairdressing; to these, furriery and men's tailoring were later added. Graduates of the schools found work either in the garment factories of the East End, or in the skilled dressmaking and fashion shops of the West End of London.

After the Second World War the minimum school leaving age was 15; junior level courses at the colleges were scrapped. Barrett Street Trade School became Barrett Street Technical College, and the Shoreditch and Clapham schools were merged to form Shoreditch College for the Garment Trades. Both had the status of technical colleges, and began to take male students also. In 1967 the two colleges were merged to form the London College for the Garment Trades. This was renamed London College of Fashion in 1974.

In 1986 the London College of Fashion became part of the London Institute, which was formed by the Inner London Education Authority to bring together seven London art, design, fashion and media schools. The London Institute became a legal entity in 1988, could award taught degrees from 1993, was granted University status in 2003 and was renamed University of the Arts London in 2004.

In August 2000 Cordwainers College, a specialist school for leather-working, shoemaking and saddlery, was merged with the London College of Fashion. It was founded in Bethnal Green in 1887 as the Leather Trade School. The name was changed to Cordwainers Technical College in about 1914, and then to Cordwainers College in 1991.

The college moved to Stratford in east London in 2023.

It is one of six constituent colleges of the University of the Arts London, the others being Camberwell College of Arts, Central Saint Martins College of Art and Design, Chelsea College of Art and Design, London College of Communication and Wimbledon College of Art.

== Campus ==
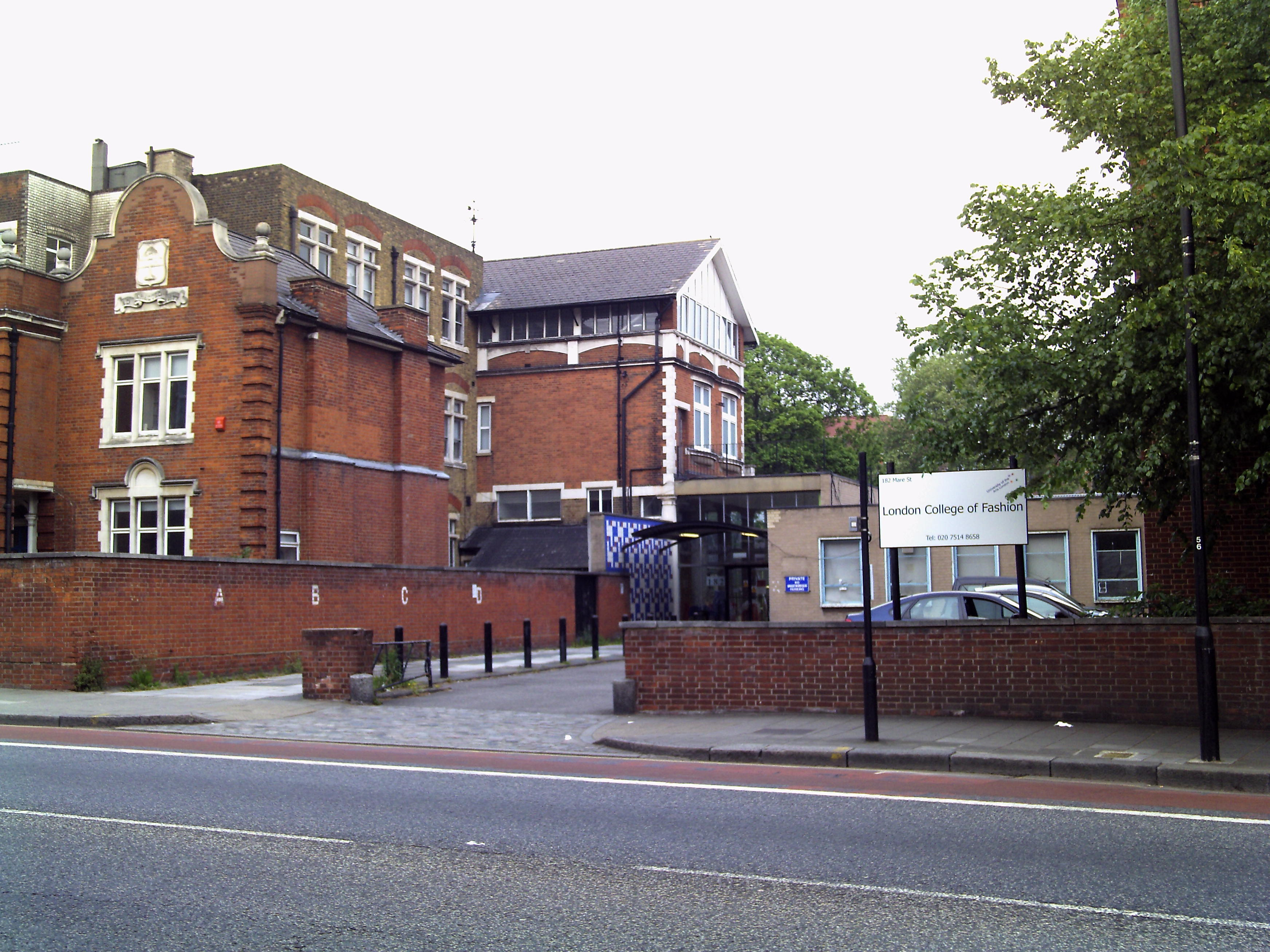
The former Mare Street premises

Until 2023, when it moved to new premises in Stratford, the main building was on John Prince's Street, just north of Oxford Circus, with other campuses at 272 High Holborn, 40 Lime Grove in Shepherd's Bush, and – in east London – 182 Mare Street, 100 Curtain Road and Golden Lane.

The new building, at 105 Carpenters Road in the Queen Elizabeth Olympic Park in Stratford, was purpose-built to designs by Allies and Morrison, which were intended to reflect 19th-century mill buildings. In September 2025, the London College of Fashion campus was shortlisted for the Stirling Prize, and it also received a 2025 RIBA National Award.

== Alumni ==
Among the alumni of the college are Jimmy Choo, shoe designer, Ioana Ciolacu, fashion designer, and Driss Jettou, former prime minister of Morocco. The fashion designer Maximilian Davis, creative director of Ferragamo since 2022, is also an alumnus.
