= Lizanne Henderson =

British historian

Lizanne Henderson (born 20th century) is a senior lecturer in history at the University of Glasgow in Dumfries. She teaches history, tourism and human–animal studies, and publishes on folklore, cultural history and the Scottish diaspore.

Her 2016 book, Witchcraft and Folk Belief in the Age of Enlightenment: Scotland, c.1670–1740, won the Katharine Briggs Folklore Award. She has also won the Michaelis-Jena Ratcliffe Folklore Prize.

== Life ==
Henderson earned a Bachelor of Arts degree with double honours in history and fine art from the University of Guelph, Ontario, and an Master of Arts degree in folklore from Memorial University of Newfoundland, St. John’s. She also has a Doctor of Philosophy degree in history from the University of Strathclyde, Glasgow. She teaches history, tourism and human–animal studies in the School of Social and Environmental Sustainability at the University of Glasgow in Dumfries.

Henderson is interested in folklore, cultural history, and the Scottish diaspora. She was visiting scholar at the University of Melbourne in 2014.

Henderson has been an editor of the journal Review of Scottish Culture. Henderson participated in a public panel on witchcraft in Dumferline in 2019.

Henderson was married to historian professor Edward J. Cowan until his death in 2022. She and her husband formally opened the Crossmichael Heritage Centre & Living History project in 2019. Afterward Cowan’s death, Henderson spent a year editing the manuscript of his book Northern Lights, about Scottish contributions to polar exploration. The book was published by Berlin in 2023. As of 2025, she was also working on a book, The Glenkens Story, based on Cowan's work.

== Awards ==
Henderson's and her husband's book Scottish Fairy Belief: A History was published by Tuckwell in 2001, and won the Michaelis-Jena Ratcliffe Folklore Prize. In 2016, Henderson's book Witchcraft and Folk Belief in the Age of Enlightenment: Scotland, c.1670–1740 won the Katharine Briggs Folklore Award.

== Books ==
- Witchcraft and Folk Belief in the Age of Enlightenment: Scotland, c.1670–1740 Palgrave 2016.
- Editor, with Edward J. Cowan, A History of Everyday Life in Medieval Scotland Edinburgh: Edinburgh University Press, 2011.
- Editor, Fantastical Imaginations: The Supernatural in Scottish History and Culture Edinburgh: John Donald, 2009.
- with Edward J. Cowan, Scottish Fairy Belief: A History East Linton: Tuckwell P, 2001; 2007. 242pp.
