= Andrew Teverson =

British literary scholar and academic administrator

Professor Andrew Simon Teverson (born 1 May 1971) is a British academic. Since 2022 he has been Head of the London College of Fashion and a Pro-Vice Chancellor of University of the Arts London.

Teverson was born in London, and educated at Durham University and Goldsmiths, University of London, completing his PhD in 1999. He has worked in the fields of folklore studies, literary history, art history, and cultural theory. His publications include works on the history of folk and fairy tales, and critical editions of the writing of Andrew Lang. In 2021, he gave the Andrew Lang Lecture at the University of St Andrews.

Teverson started working at London College of Fashion in 2019, when he became Dean of Academic Strategy. Previous roles include Associate Dean of the Faculty of Arts and Social Sciences at Kingston University and Assistant Director of the External Degree in English at the University of London. As Head of London College of Fashion, he oversaw the move of the College to its new premises in Queen Elizabeth Olympic Park in 2023.
