= Historiographer Royal (Scotland) =

Member of the Royal household of Scotland

The Historiographer Royal is a member of the Royal household of Scotland. The office was created in 1681, and was in abeyance from 1709 until 1763 when it was revived for Principal William Robertson of the University of Edinburgh.

The post, which now has no formal responsibilities or salary, is appointed by the Sovereign by Letters Patent passed under the Great Seal of Scotland.

The current office-holder is Christopher Smout, Emeritus Professor of History at the University of St Andrews.

== Office Holders ==
Holders of the office are:

- James Crawford: 11 Nov 1681
- William Turner: 30 Sep 1682
- James Fall: 16 Dec 1682
- Christopher Irving: 30 July 1686
- William Dunlop: 31 Jan 1693
- Daniel Campbell: 1 April 1700
- David Crawford jr of Drumsoy: 5 Oct 1704
- David Sympsone: 12 May 1708 – 4 July 1709

Office vacant from 1709 until 1763

- William Robertson: 6 Aug 1763
- John Gillies: 15 Jun 1793
- George Brodie: 5 Mar 1836
- John Hill Burton: 29 Aug 1867
- William Forbes Skene: 14 Nov 1881
- David Masson: 3 Mar 1893
- Peter Hume Brown: 4 May 1908
- Sir Robert Rait: 11 Jan 1919
- Robert Kerr Hannay: 14 July 1930
- Henry William Meikle: 23 Sep 1940
- J. D. Mackie: 19 Sep 1958 – 1978
- Gordon Donaldson: 1979–1993
- Christopher Smout: 1993–
