= Peter Hume Brown =

19th-century Scottish historian and scholar

Peter Hume Brown

Peter Hume Brown, FBA (17 December 1849 – 1 December 1918) was a Scottish historian and professor who played an important part in establishing Scottish history as a significant academic discipline. In addition to teaching and writing, he spent 16 years as editor of the Register of the Privy Council of Scotland, and served as Historiographer Royal.

== Early life ==
Hume Brown was born in Tranent but soon he and his widowed mother moved to Prestonpans, a few miles away, where he started at the Free Church school in 1857. After his mother's death in 1866 he stayed at the school as a pupil teacher for another three years.

He taught in England and Wales before starting a degree in theology at Edinburgh in 1872. He decided he had no vocation to be a minister and left in 1874, only to start a different course the following year, graduating as MA in 1878. In the meantime he had started on a lifelong "loyal ... friendship" with R. B. Haldane who shared some of his intellectual interests. He had also sold his theology books and bought Montaigne's Essays instead. For the rest of his life, Hume Brown's interest in French and German culture flourished alongside his dedication to the history of Scotland; the biographies he wrote of George Buchanan and John Knox gave full attention to the influence of continental Europe in their lives.

== Independent scholar ==
After graduation he started a private school, and married the following year, 1879. His wife died only three years later, and Hume Brown gave up the school, earning a small living through private teaching and writing for Chambers' Encyclopaedia, while tolerating periods of material "privation" to concentrate on his own independent studies. He had little hope of a university post in history, which at that time was not a well-supported subject at Edinburgh or other Scottish universities. He pursued his research and published his first book, George Buchanan, Humanist and Reformer, in 1890. Three other books followed before his biography of Knox in 1895. In 1896 he was made an honorary LLD by Edinburgh, and later honorary degrees came from St Andrews and the University of Geneva.

Now Hume Brown's reputation as a historian was established, Cambridge University Press commissioned a three-volume History of Scotland. In the year the first volume was published, 1898, Hume Brown was asked to succeed David Masson, his old teacher, as editor of the Register of the Privy Council of Scotland, which brought him financial security, and access to historically crucial 17th century documents.

== Professor of Scottish history ==
In 1901 Edinburgh University made him its first professor of Scottish history, after receiving a bequest for this purpose. The appointment highlights Hume Brown's major role in "establish[ing] the academic respectability of Scottish history". When this new departure for the university was announced, Hume Brown was described as "a man of new mark and likelihood among Scottish historical scholars" whose book Scotland before 1700 "presents a view of Scotland based entirely upon contemporary native sources". Before Hume Brown's inaugural address the principal expressed pleasure that "there was being introduced a fresh subject into the work of the University." The new professor himself said it could not be a "revolutionary step" for a university to include study of "the national history".

Hume Brown was concerned with Scotland's nationhood, and saw the Reformation as a key period in the development of a national consciousness, when "Scotland was entering on a new phase of her national life". He lectured his students on the Making of Scotland, while conceding that no historian could ever give a fully adequate account of the "making" of a nation. He was interested in studying Scotland in a European context more than in the context of the British Empire, and stressed that one country's history could only be understood by "reference to the histories of other countries". Though his writing style is considered restrained, he was more outgoing in conversation, entertaining friends and making an impression on the younger people around him.

At first his lectures only covered the years up to 1500, but when a second specialist on the history of Scotland, Henry Meikle, joined him in 1909, he added a course taking students up to 1800. He was invited to give prestigious lecture series at other universities, including the Rhind lectures for 1903 on "Scotland in the Time of Queen Mary" and the Ford Lectures for 1913/14. In 1908 he was made Historiographer Royal.

== The Haldanes and Goethe ==
Lord Haldane, his mother and his sister Elizabeth were a lifelong support and regularly invited Hume Brown to their estate at Cloan in Perthshire, a change from the suburban home where he lived alone except for his dog. Between 1898 and 1912 he made annual trips with Haldane to Weimar where Goethe had lived, the two sharing an enthusiasm for Goethe's work and German literature in general. In 1913 Hume Brown brought out the first half of a biography of Goethe; the other volume would appear posthumously, nearly complete in 1918, but edited by Richard and Elizabeth Haldane who also published a collection of his lectures.

Hume Brown also admired the French literary critic Sainte-Beuve, and believed the study of history should not be separated from literature. Other writers whose work particularly influenced his thought were Montaigne and Renan.

He died suddenly on 1 December 1918, leaving behind him a substantial body of published work, and a new sense of Scottish history as a major academic subject. His will gave the University of Edinburgh not only a death mask of Goethe he had received from the Masson family, but money to fund a prize connected with his own field. The Hume Brown prize is now awarded biennially to a previously unpublished writer who makes an "original contribution to Scottish History".

== Selected works ==
- George Buchanan, humanist and reformer, a biography 1506–1582 (David Douglas 1890)
- Early Travellers in Scotland, edited by P. Hume Brown (David Douglas 1891)
- Vernacular writings of George Buchanan, edited by P. Hume Brown (Edinburgh 1892)
- Scotland before 1700, from contemporary documents (David Douglas 1893)
- John Knox: a biography (Adam and Charles Black 1895)
- History of Scotland, Vols 1–3 (Cambridge 1899–1909)
- A history of Scotland for schools (Edinburgh 1907)
- The Youth of Goethe (John Murray 1913)
- The legislative union of England and Scotland (Clarendon Press, 1914)
- Life of Goethe, ed. E. and R. Haldane (London 1920)

== Sources ==
- Robertson, John Peter Hume Brown in the Oxford Dictionary of National Biography (2004)
- Davis, H.W.C. Peter Hume Brown in the Dictionary of National Biography (1927)
- The Scotsman archives:
  - Sir William Fraser Professorship of Ancient History and Palaeography, 20 July 1901
  - The Edinburgh University Chair of Ancient History, 23 October 1901
  - Professor Hume Brown on "The Making of Scotland", 15 October 1902
  - The Late Professor Hume Brown, 2 December 1918
  - Professor Hume Brown's Will, 10 December 1918

== Notes ==
The next professor of Scottish History at Edinburgh was Robert Kerr Hannay (1867–1940), appointed in February 1919.
