= Archie Duncan (historian) =

British historian

Archibald Alexander McBeth Duncan (17 October 1926 – 20 December 2017) was a Scottish historian.

From 1962 to 1993 he was Professor of Scottish History and Literature at the University of Glasgow. He was also President of the Scottish History Society, and edited the Scottish Historical Review from 1963 to 1970. On giving up his professorship, he became Clerk of Senate and Dean of Faculties, retiring from the university in 2000. From 2001 he was Emeritus Professor of Scottish History and Literature, but continued to publish on the history of Scotland in the Middle Ages.

== Select bibliography ==
- Scotland: The Making of the Kingdom. Edinburgh: Edinburgh University Press, 1973.
- Regesta Regum Scottorum, v; The Acts of Robert I, 1306-1329. Edinburgh: Edinburgh University Press, 1988.
- The Kingship of the Scots: Succession and Independence 842–1292. Edinburgh: Edinburgh University Press, 2002.

Academic offices
Preceded by George Smith Pryde	Professor of Scottish History and Literature, Glasgow; 1962-1993	Succeeded by Professor Ted Cowan
