= Arthur Clayden =

New Zealand journalist and emigration agent

Arthur Clayden (9 August 1829 – 22 August 1899) was a New Zealand journalist and emigration agent.

Clayden was born in Wallingford, Berkshire, England on 9 August 1829.

Clayden early identified himself with the agricultural labourers' movement, becoming a member of the consultative committee of the National Agricultural Labourers' Union, under the presidency of Joseph Arch. In 1873 he accompanied Arch to Canada for the purpose of investigating that colony as a field of emigration, contributing letters to the Daily News on the subject. In 1879 he went out to New Zealand, and while there acted as correspondent for the Daily News. He returned to England in 1890. Clayden delivered lectures on "New Zealand as an Emigration Field"; and in 1885 read a paper before the Royal Colonial Institute on "New Zealand in 1884." Some of his letters and lectures have been published in pamphlet form.
