= Armorial of British universities =

British university coats of arms

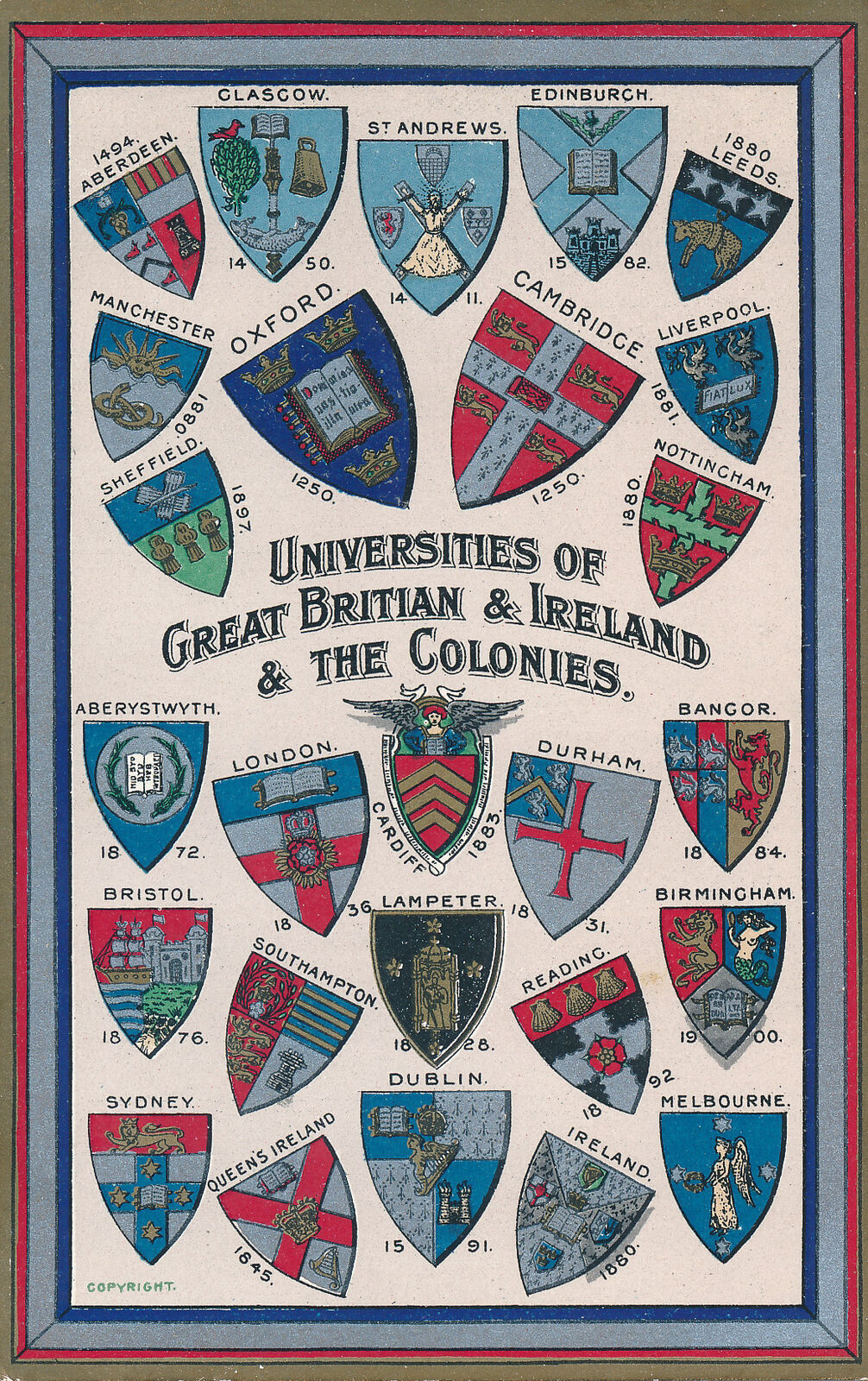
Early 20th century postcard depicting the coats of arms of British universities

The armorial of British universities is the collection of coats of arms of universities in the United Kingdom. Modern arms of universities began appearing in England around the middle of the 15th century, with Oxford's being possibly the oldest university arms in the world, being adopted (prior to the establishment of the College of Arms) around the end of the 14th century. The earliest granting of university arms was to King's College Cambridge by Henry VI in 1449. Arms are granted in respect of England, Wales and Northern Ireland by the College of Arms and, for Scotland, by the Lyon Court. It has been suggested that new universities register arms in an attempt to appear more traditional or legitimate. As corporations, older university arms have historically been granted without a crest, however newer institutions use crests with mantling, including new colleges at older universities. The first crest granted to a university was to Leeds in 1905 while the first British university to be granted supporters was Sussex in 1962, although both Oxford and Cambridge have used angels as supporters and Cambridge has used the 'alma mater' emblem as a crest without these components being officially granted.

University and college arms often incorporate, or are simply copies of, arms of their founders or local authorities. At collegiate universities, constituent colleges may bear their own arms, such as at Cambridge and Oxford. Many older coats of arms were recorded by Arthur Charles Fox-Davies in The Book of Public Arms in 1915, which also recorded some coats of arms of constituent colleges, and by John Woodward in A Treatise on Ecclesiastical Heraldry in 1894. Most university mottos are not granted with the coats of arms, instead being added by custom by the institution, an exception to this being the arms of Imperial College London. Those universities in Ireland that existed prior to independence from the United Kingdom were granted arms along the lines of other British universities; these are listed separately below.

An open book (referencing historically the Christian Bible) as a symbol of 'wisdom', 'knowledge' or 'learning' is common to many arms. The Sun, a flaming torch or a lamp representing enlightenment features often, as do a wheatsheaf symbolising growth and an owl representing wisdom. A martlet, representing strenuous effort, is sometimes found. Keys in the form of crossed keys, pairs of keys or a single key held by a beast are also common to several university arms. The keys represent access to heaven and symbolically the access to greater things in this world brought about through education.

Most British universities have a coat of arms, but some universities, particularly former schools of art or design (now arts universities), are not armigerous. These include Arden University, Arts University Bournemouth, Arts University Plymouth, Bath Spa University, BPP University, Leeds Arts University, Norwich University of the Arts, Oxford Brookes University, Regent's University London, University of Bedfordshire, University of Brighton, University College London, Ravensbourne University London, University of Roehampton (although two of its colleges are armigerous) and the University of West London.

The images below may either be the coat of arms in the form of a shield (escutcheon) or the 'full heraldic achievement', as granted by the College of Arms or the Lyon Court. Some arms may be assumed arms, if they are often taken from a founder or benefactor, particularly in the case of colleges and halls within universities.

== Arms of universities ==
=== Ancient universities ===
| Arms | University | Full Achievement |
|---|---|---|
| | Aberdeen, granted 26 September 1888 Escutcheon: Quarterly: 1st Azure a bough pot Or charged with three salmon fishes in fret Proper and containing as many lilies of the garden the dexter in bud the centre full blown and the sinister half blown also Proper flowered Argent issuant from the middle chief amid rays of the sun a dexter hand holding an open book likewise Proper, 2nd Argent a chief paly of six Or and Gules, 3rd Argent a chevron sable between three boars' heads erased Gules armed of the field and langued Azure, 4th Gules a tower triple-towered Argent masoned Sable windows and port of the last. Motto: Initium Sapientiae Timor Domini (The beginning of wisdom is fear of the Lord) The university's coat of arms incorporates those of the founders and locations of the two colleges it is derived from. In the top left quadrant are the arms of the burgh of Old Aberdeen, with the addition of a symbol of knowledge being handed down from above. Top right are those of George Keith, the fifth Earl Marischal. Bottom left are those of Bishop William Elphinstone. The bottom right quarter is a simplified version of the three castles which represent the city of Aberdeen (this symbol of the city also appears prominently on the arms of The Robert Gordon University). In 1995 the university was granted a crest and supporters to celebrate its 500th anniversary. These are a leopard on the dexter a side and a hart on the sinister. | |
| | Cambridge, granted 1573 Escutcheon: Gules on a cross Ermine between four lions passant Or a Bible lying fessways of the field clasped and garnished of the third the clasps in base. Motto: Hinc Lucem Et Pocula Sacra (From here, light and sacred draughts) - adopted by custom; not part of the grant The lions represent the university's royal patronage, the ermine represents dignity, and the Bible on the cross represents both knowledge and the Christian faith. Critics point to the closed book; compare Oxford below. | |
| | Edinburgh, granted 22 October 1789 Escutcheon: Argent on a saltire Azure between a thistle Proper in chief and a castle on rock Sable in base a book expanded Or. The saltire and thistle are national symbols of Scotland (although the former's colours are reversed), while the castle is taken from the coat of arms of Edinburgh. The open book symbolizes learning. | |
| | Glasgow, granted 14 June 1900 Escutcheon: Azure the university mace in pale Or between on the dexter a tree surmounted on top by a bird Proper on the sinister an ancient handbell and in chief an open book Argent and surmounted in base of a salmon on its back holding in its mouth a signet ring also Proper. Motto: Via Veritas Vita (The way, the truth, the life) (St John's Gospel, chapter 14) The tree, bird, bell and fish (salmon) are taken from the coat of arms of the city of Glasgow and refer to Saint Mungo. In addition there is a book representing learning and a depiction of the university mace. | |
| | Oxford, confirmed in 1574 Escutcheon: Azure, upon a book open proper leathered gules garnished or having on the dexter side seven seals of the last the words DOMINVS ILLVMINATIO MEA all between three open crowns two and one or. Motto: Dominus illuminatio mea (The Lord is my light) In his Display of Heraldrie (1610), John Guillim interprets the arms as follows: The Book itself some have thought to signifie that Book mentioned in the Apocalyps, having seven Seals: but these here are taken rather to be the seven Liberal Sciences, and the Crowns to be the reward and honour of Learning and Wisdome; and the triplicity of the Crowns are taken to represent the three Cardinal Professions or Faculties before specified [Theology, Physick and Law]. The Inscription I find to vary according to variety of times: some having Sapientia & Felicitate, Wisdome and Happiness; others (and that very ancient) Deus illuminatio mea, The Lord is my light; others this, Veritas liberat, bonitas regnabit, Truth frees us, Godliness crowneth us; and others thus, In principio, &c. In the beginning was the Word, and the Word was with God. | |
| | St Andrews, granted 24 November 1905 Escutcheon: Parted per saltire Argent and Azure in chief a book expanded Proper leaved Gules and in base a lion rampant of the last armed and langued of the second on a chief of the fourth a crescent reversed of the first between two mascles Or. Motto Αἰὲν ἀριστεύειν (Ever to excel) The silver and blue saltire references Scotland. The open book represents learning. The lion rampant is from the royal arms of Scotland and represents King James I (1406–1437). The crescent moon represents Peter de Luna who as Pope Benedict XIII issued the bulls of foundation in 1413. The gold mascles ('voided lozenges') on the chief are taken from the personal arms of Henry Wardlaw, Bishop of St Andrews (1404–1440). | |

=== 19th-century universities ===
| Arms | University | Full Achievement |
|---|---|---|
| | Durham, granted 22 May 1843 Escutcheon: Argent a Cross Pattée quadrate Gules; a Canton Azure charged with a Chevron Or between three Lions rampant of the First. Motto: Fundamenta Ejus Super Montibus Sanctis (Her foundations are upon the holy hills) (Psalm 87) The arms feature St Cuthbert's cross, referencing the link to Durham Cathedral (the shrine of St Cuthbert) and, in the canton, the arms of Bishop Hatfield of Durham, the founder of Durham College, Oxford, advancing the idea that the university is its successor institute. St Cuthbert's Cross was used as the university's seal prior to the grant of arms and appears on the coats of arms of many Durham colleges, as well as those of Newcastle University. | |
| | London, granted 10 April 1838 Escutcheon: Argent on a cross Gules the union rose irradiated and ensigned with the imperial crown Proper a chief Azure thereon an open book also Proper the clasps Gold. The arms depict a cross of St George upon which there is a Tudor or Union rose (radiating light) surmounted by a crown. The cross links to the arms of the city of London. The rose and crown symbolise royal and imperial connections. The open book in the chief represents learning. | |
| | Wales, granted 2 May 1910 Escutcheon: Argent on a fess murrey three medieval lamps Or all within a bordure of the second charged with eight mullets of the third. Crest: Upon a Helm a Wreath of the colours a Dragon statant Gules resting the dexter claw on an open book Proper inscribed with the words "GOREU AWEN GWIRIONEDD" (The Best Inspiration is Truth); Motto: Scientia Ingenium Artes (Science, engineering, arts) The university was founded by royal charter in 1893 as a federal university with three constituent colleges – Aberystwyth, Bangor and Cardiff. The lamps in the design represent these three colleges. The eight mullets or stars represent the constituent elements which made up the original university court. These were representatives appointed by the governing bodies of the foundation colleges (Aberystwyth, Bangor, and Cardiff), representatives of the teaching faculties and academic boards from the colleges, representatives elected by the body of university graduates, delegates representing the county councils and municipal authorities of Wales and Monmouthshire, representatives linked to secondary and intermediate education, members nominated directly by the Crown, representatives from affiliated theological colleges, co-opted national civic members. | |

=== Civic Universities ===
| Arms | University | Full Achievement |
|---|---|---|
| | Birmingham, granted 27 August 1900 Escutcheon: Per chevron the chief per pale Gules and Azure in dexter a lion rampant with two heads in sinister a mermaid holding in the dexter hand a mirror and in the sinister a comb Or the base Sable charged with an open book Proper with two buckles and straps and edges of the third inscribed "PER ARDUA AD ALTA". Motto: Per ardua ad alta (Through efforts great heights are reached) The open book represents learning. The double headed lion and mermaid are adopted from the arms of Josiah Mason founder of the Mason Science College an institution which was incorporated into the university in 1900. | |
| | Bristol, granted 4 December 1909 Escutcheon: Argent on a cross quadrant Gules a representation of the arms of the City of Bristol between in pale a sun in splendour and an open book Proper leaved and clasped Or and inscribed with the words "NISI QUIA DOMINUS" and in fesse to the dexter a dolphin embowed and to the sinister a horse courant both of the third. Motto: Vim Promovet Insitam (Promote one's innate power) The arms contain symbols representing the families of three benefactors i.e. the sun for the Wills family, a horse for the Fry family and a dolphin for the Colston family. The open book represents learning. The ship and castle are taken from the Bristol city coat of arms.NISI QUIA DOMINUS means "If the Lord himself had not been on our side". | |
| | Exeter, granted 24 May 1924 (as University College of the South West of England) Escutcheon: Argent, a saltire vert surmounted in chief of an open book proper inscribed with the words LUCEM SEQUIMUR; on a chief gules a triple-towered fortress gold; all within a bordure sable bezantee. Motto: Lucem sequimur (We follow the light) Note: The College of the South West of England formed the University of Exeter in 1955, to which the arms transferred. The university coat of arms symbolises the university's historical associations with the region. The triangular gold castle with three towers comes from Exeter's coat of arms and represents Rougemont Castle, as alluded to by the red background. The 15 gold bezants (Byzantine gold coins) that appear around the edge of the shield are from the arms of the Duchy of Cornwall and represent Cornwall, while the green cross on the white background is from the city of Plymouth's coat of arms. The theme of learning is symbolised by the book. | |
| | Hull, granted 22 November 1927 (as University College Hull) Escutcheon: Azure, a torch fired and enfiled with a ducal coronet Or between on the dexter a rose argent, barbed and seeded proper, and on the sinister a fleur-de-lys of the second; on a chief wavy of the third a dove of the first. Motto: Lampada Ferens (Carrying the light of learning) The symbols are the white rose for Yorkshire, the torch for learning, the ducal coronet from the arms of the city of Hull, the fleur-de-lys for Lincolnshire and the dove, symbolising peace, from the arms of benefactor Thomas Ferens. | |
| | Leeds, granted 10 August 1905 Escutcheon: Vert an open book Proper edged and clasped Or inscribed with the words "ET AUGEBITUR SCIENTIA" between in chief three mullets Argent and in base a rose of the last seeded Proper. Crest: On a wreath of the colours a Greek sphinx Gules. Motto: Et augebitur scientia (And knowledge will be increased) The three stars (mullets) are taken from the arms of the city of Leeds and derived originally from the coat of arms of Sir Thomas Danby who was the first mayor. The open book represents learning. The white rose is a symbol of Yorkshire | |
| | Leicester, granted 3 April 1922 to predecessor University College, Leicester Escutcheon: Gules, an open book strapped proper and buckled and inscribed with the words "Ut Vitam Habeant" in letters Or, between in chief two cinquefoils pierced ermine and in base a horse shoe also Or. Crest: On a wreath of the colours, A demi gryphon segreant Or holding between the claws an open book as in the Arms. Motto: Ut vitam habeant (So that they may have life) The open book symbolises learning. One of the cinquefoils represents the city of Leicester, the other the county of Leicestershire. The horseshoe represents the county of Rutland. The demi-gryphon on the crest is taken from the arms of benefactor Thomas Fielding Johnson. The institution was called Leicestershire and Rutland University College from 1921 to 1927 and University College, Leicester from 1927 to 1957. | |
| | Liverpool, granted 30 October 1903 Escutcheon: Azure an open book Argent inscribed "FIAT LUX" in letters Sable bound and on the sinister side seven clasps Or between three cormorants otherwise called Livers wings elevated of the second each holding in the beak a branch of seaweed called Laver proper. Motto: Haec Otia Studia Fovent (These days of peace foster learning) Note: granted in 1903 according to Fox-Davies, but recorded as in use by University College, Liverpool in 1894 by Woodward. The book of learning is enscribed with the Latin FIAT LUX meaning 'Let there be light'. | |
| | Manchester, granted 10 May 2010 Escutcheon: Per fess nebuly enhanced Bleu-celeste and Purpure issuant in chief a sun in Splendour or in base three bees volant Proper. Crest: Upon a helm within a coronet composed of four roses Purpure barbed Argent seeded and set upon a circlet Or a demi lion guardant Or murally crowned Argent holding in the paws a torch erect Sable enflamed Or. Motto: Cognitio, sapientia, humanitas (Knowledge, wisdom and humanity) The arms combine elements of the two predecessor institutions University of Manchester Institute of Science and Technology (UMIST) and the Victoria University of Manchester. The crowned lion on the crest appeared on the UMIST coat of arms, while the sun against a blue background belonged to the Victoria shield, symbolising growing enlightenment. The (worker) bees symbolise the university's connection with the city of Manchester and also appear on the UMIST arms. | |
| | Newcastle, granted 28 January 1938 (as King's College, Durham) Escutcheon: Azure, a cross of St Cuthbert argent; on a chief of the last a lion passant guardant gules. Note: King's College, Durham became the University of Newcastle upon Tyne in 1963. As a former college of Durham University the arms feature St Cuthbert's cross, referencing the link to Durham Cathedral (the shrine of St Cuthbert). The lion represents the royal connection of the former King's College. | |
| | Nottingham, granted 15 April 1948 Escutcheon: Barry wavy of six argent and azure, a cross moline gules; on a chief of the last an open book proper clasped Or inscribed with the words 'Quaerenti Ostium', in Roman characters sable between two domed towers also proper, that to the dexter ensigned with an increscent of the first and that to the sinister with an estoile, also Or. Crest: On a wreath of the colours, On a mount vert an oak tree proper, fructed Or, between two garbs resting against the trunk gold. Motto: Sapientia Urbs Conditur (A city is built on wisdom) The Latin text on the book (of knowledge) Quaerenti Ostium means 'an entrance for the seeker'. | |
| | Queen's, Belfast, granted 24 March 1910 by Nevile Wilkinson, Ulster King of Arms. Escutcheon: Per saltire Azure and Argent on a saltire Gules between in chief an open book and in base a harp both Proper in dexter a hand couped of the third and in sinister a seahorse gorged with a mural crown of the fourth an imperial crown of the last. Motto: Pro Tanto Quid Retribuamus (What shall we give in return for so much?) The crown represents the link to Queen Victoria and the university's early link to the former Queen's University of Ireland. St Patrick's saltire references Ireland and was also found on the arms of the former institution. The book represents learning, the seahorse Belfast, the harp Ireland and the red hand Ulster. | |
| | Reading, granted 7 August 1896 (as Reading University Extension College) Escutcheon: Per fesse gules and sable, in chief three escallops fessewise or and in base a cross engrailed argent, a rose of the first thorned and seeded proper. The Reading University Extension College became the University of Reading in 1926. The three scallop shells in the chief are derived from the coat of arms of Reading Abbey. The engrailed cross is adopted from the arms of Christ Church Oxford, the sponsor of the then Extension College. The Lancashire rose references the arms of the royal county of Berkshire. | |
| | Sheffield, granted June 1905 Escutcheon: Azure an open book Proper edged Gold inscribed with the words "DISCE DOCE" between in fess two sheaves of eight arrows interlaced saltireways and banded Argent in chief an open crown Or and in base a rose also Argent barbed and seeded Proper. Motto: Rerum Cognoscere Causas (To know the cause of things) The open book inscribed with Disce Doce (Learn and Teach) is self-explanatory. The sheaves of eight silver arrows are from the arms of the city of Sheffield. The gold crown is a 'crown of success' i.e. an emblem of achievement and the white rose represents Yorkshire. | |
| | Southampton, granted 1 March 1, 1948 Escutcheon: Argent, a hart trippant gules; on a chief azure an open book proper, edged and bound or Crest: On a wreath of the colours, A dragon rampant Or supporting a staff proper, flying therefrom to the sinister a flag per fesse argent and gules charged with three roses counterchanged [two and one] barbed and seeded also proper Motto: Strenuis Ardua Cedunt (The heights yield to endeavour) The open book in the chief is a symbol of learning. The hart is a wordplay referencing Henry Robinson Hartley who bequeathed funds to form the Hartley Institution which eventually became the University of Southampton. Note: although not part of the blazon there is a version of the arms with two additional tudor roses in the chief in use, including the university's current logo. | |

=== 1960s Universities ===
| Arms | University | Full Achievement |
|---|---|---|
| | Aston, granted 18 March 1955 to predecessor the College of Technology, Birmingham. Grant of supporters 29 June 2016. Escutcheon: Azure, five lozenges conjoined in bend Or; on a chief argent, an open book proper, bound gules edged Or, between two hammers erect sable. Crest: On a wreath argent, gules and sable, Out of a mural crown sable a cubit arm, vested argent, the hand proper holding a torch gules enflamed also proper, between two branches of laurel Or; Supporters: To the dexter a Canada Goose and to the sinister a Red Squirrel both proper each wreathed about the neck with Gorse Or; Motto: Forward On the chief the book represents learning and the ball-pein hammers the connection with metalwork industry. The mural crown in the crest is used by public bodies. The laurel wreath represents academia and also a link to Birmingham. The five lozenges reference the arms of the city of Birmingham. | |
| | Bath, granted 15 November 1966 Escutcheon: Azure, a sword in pale argent, hilt and pommel Or, the point ensigned by a Watt governor proper, between in fess two heads of Sul Or. Crest: On a wreath Or, argent and azure, Out of a mural crown argent, an eagle, wings expanded and inverted Or, supporting with the dexter claw a key, wards upward and outward, silver. Supporters: On the dexter side a wyvern erect vert charged on the body with mullets, each of six points, Or; and on the sinister side a unicorn sejant erect Or, armed, unguled, crined and tufted sable, charged on the body with mullets of six points vert; the whole upon a compartment of water barry wavy of four argent and azure between two river banks proper, sprouting therefrom roses argent, barbed seeded, slipped and leaved proper. Motto: Generatim Discite Cultus (Learn the culture proper to each after its kind) The sword is taken from the arms of the City of Bath, the two Gorgon's heads are the main symbol of the university, taken from a Roman sculpture found in the city. The Watt Governor is a common component in engines and duly represents technology taught at the university; once a merchant's school. The full heraldic achievement can be found displayed on buildings at the university campus. | |
| | Bradford, granted 20 Feb 1967 Escutcheon: Gules, an open book proper, edged, bound and having seven clasps, between in chief two bugle horns stringed Or and in base a rose argent barbed and seeded proper Crest: On a wreath of the colours, Issuant from the stock of an oak tree sprouting leaves, a cubit arm proper grasping a torch sable, issuant thereform seven rays of the sun Or; Supporters: On either side a falcon, wings addorsed, argent, issuant from the head seven rays of the sun as in the crest. Motto: Give invention light The white Yorkshire rose on the red background symbolises the West Riding of that county. The bugle horns are taken from the arms of the city of Bradford. The open book represents learning and the seven clasps the quadrivium and trivium of classical education. On the crest the flaming torch represents enlightenment. The white falcon supporters reference the House of York and also link to the sun god Horus. | |
| | Dundee, granted to predecessor University College of Dundee, 18 July 1949 Escutcheon: Per saltire Argent and Azure, on a chief Gules a coronet of four fleurs-de-lys (two visible) and four crosses pattee (one and two halves visible) Or. Motto: Magnificat anima mea dominum (My soul doth magnify the Lord) The blue and silver pattern references the Scottish saltire and links also to the arms of the University of St Andrews of which the university was formerly a college. | |
| | East Anglia, granted 5 March 1964 Escutcheon: Azure, three ancient crowns Or, in chief a castle of three domes argent, flying from each the banner of St George, the port sable, portcullis raised Or; Crest: On a wreath argent, Or, and azure, Issuing from clouds proper an angel vested argent, mantled azure, winged, crined and crowned Or, holding in the dexter hand a sword erect proper, hilt and pomel Or, and in the sinister hand an open book also proper, edged, bound and leathered Or. Supporters: On either side a lion guardant Or, pendent from the neck by cords tasselled a purse azure, and holding with the interior paw an ancient crown gold. Motto: Do different The castle is taken from the Arms of Norwich. The three gold crowns are incorporated as the traditional emblems of East Anglia, being the crowns of St Edmund, King of the East Angles; representing his sovereignty, martyrdom and innocence. | |
| | Essex, granted 10 December 1963 Escutcheon: Gules, three seaxes in pale, cutting edges upwards, argent, pomels and hilts to the dexter Or, in chief an open book proper edged and bound with seven clasps Or; Crest: On a wreath of the colours, A wyvern statant argent upon two branch of oak raguly leaved fructed in saltire proper enfiled through an annulet argent Motto: Thought the harder, heart the keener The arms are those of the county of Essex, derived from the Kingdom of the East Saxons, with the addition of an open book to represent learning with seven clasps symbolising the quadrivium and trivium of classical education. The two oak branches on the crest represent the Wivenhoe parkland and the ancient Forest of Essex. On the crest there is a wyvern above an annulet. This is a wordplay of 'Wyvern-O' to represent the site of the university's main campus. | |
| | Heriot-Watt, granted 8 August 1958 to predecessor Heriot Watt College Escutcheon: Per pale, two coats both demidiated; dexter, barry of six or and azure, an oak tree eradicated vert; sinister, argent, on a fess azure between an open book undemidiated, binding gules, in chief proper, and a mullet in base of the second, three cinquefoils of the first. Motto: Arte et Animo (By skill and courage) The arms contain elements of those of the Watt and Heriot families. The oak tree and gold and blue bars are from the arms granted to the son of James Watt (also called James). The Heriot arms with the cinquefoils and mullet (star) are also used by George Heriot's School. The book which is added to the Heriot arms, represents learning. | |
| | Keele, granted 20 June 1950 to predecessor the University College of North Staffordshire, Escutcheon: Or, on a chevron gules an open book argent, in base a scythe proper; on a chief wavy of the second a Stafford knot between a fleur-de-lys and a fret of the second. Crest: On a wreath of the colours, In front of a laurel vert a representation of Rodin's statue "Le Penseur" Or. Motto: Thanke God For All; Note: Before 1962 the institution was called the University College of North Staffordshire. The scythe is from the arms of the Sneyd family, who owned the Keele park estate from 1540 to 1949. The Sneyd family motto "Thanke God for All" was also adopted. The shield features the colours red and yellow to represent the County of Staffordshire as well as the Staffordshire chevron. The Stafford knot for Stafford, the Fleur-de-Lys for Burton upon Trent and the Fret depict the historical association with the industry of Stoke-on-Trent. On the crest an open book joins Rodin's Le Penseur, which is represented amid a wreath of laurel vert. | |
| | Lancaster, granted 20 May 1966 Escutcheon: Or, a fesse wavy argent charged with two barrulets wavy azure between in chief two roses gules barbed and seeded and in base an open book proper bound and clasped; on a chief gules a lion passant Or. Crest: On a wreath of the colours, In front of two quill pens in saltire, points downward, azure, feathered Or, a Herdwick ram's head caboshed proper. Supporters: On the dexter side a bull gules, armed, unguled, collared and pendent from the collar a Panassus flower Or; and on the sinister side a dragon gules, collared and pendent from the collar a fleur-de-lys Or. Motto: Patet omnibus veritas (Truth lies open to all) The wavy blue line refers to the River Lune, a prominent geographic landmark of the city of Lancaster. Secondly, the two red roses are symbols of the House of Lancaster (and the county of Lancashire) and are taken directly from the arms of the Lancashire County Council. The open book represents wisdom and the university's purpose as an institution of learning. Lastly, the Lion passant comes from the arms of the Duchy of Lancaster. | |
| | Loughborough, granted 5 October 1966 Escutcheon: Sable, on a cross engrailed purpure fimbriated argent between in the first quarter a cross composed of the upper and lower limbs of a cross crosslet and the horizontal limbs of a cross formy, and in the fourth quarter a thunderbolt, an ancient lamp, all Or. Crest: On a wreath of the colours, A peacock proper supporting with the dexter claw a key purpure, the wards upward and irradiated Or. Motto: Veritate, Scientia, Labore (By truth, wisdom, and labour) The official colour of the university is African violet. The coat of arms incorporates symbols relevant to the history of the Loughborough area and of education in general. They are Offa of Mercia's cross (a symbol of the ancient kingdom of Mercia, within whose borders the town now stands), the peafowl from the arms of the Dukes of Rutland and a lamp representing learning and enlightenment. | |
| | Open, granted 1971, replaced 15 June 2011 Escutcheon: Azure, an open book Proper bound Gules and irradiated Or and on a Chief also Or two wreaths of laurel fructed Proper. Crest: On a Wreath Or and Azure, between two branches of laurel Or the leaves fimbriated Gules a round based escutcheon Azure round pierced in the Canton. Supporters: On either side a lion rampant Or supporting a sapling leaved and fructed Proper. Motto: Learn and live In the original arms a television screen and a pair of tape reels represented the technology initially used to support teaching. The new grant in 2011 removed the television screen, but retained the book and replaced the tape reels with laurel wreaths. The escutcheon featured in the crest is used as a logo by the university. | |
| | Salford, granted 6 January 2017 Escutcheon: Sable above a demi Sun issuant in base Argent charged with a demi Rose likewise issuant Gules barbed and seeded proper a Chain fesswise throughout enhanced and enarched and a Chief embattled and enarched Argent. Crest: Upon a Helm with a Wreath Argent and Sable A Lion passant guardant Gules armed langued and resting the dexter hind paw on a Shuttle fesswise Or and supporting with the dexter forepaw a Fire Beacon Sable enflamed proper tied to the pole thereof by a knot at the mid point of its length and flying to the sinister a Riband party lengthwise Argent and Sable Mantled Gules lined Argent. Supporters: On either side a Heraldic Antelope Sable attired langued and tufted Gules teeth Argent unguled and charged on the shoulder with a Bee volant Or and resting the interior hind foot on a Mooring Bollard Gules wound round with a Rope Or all upon a Compartment comprising a Quayside of grey stone setts issuant from Waves of Water proper. Motto Altiora Petamus (Let us seek higher things) On the shield the red rose represents Lancashire, the sun enlightenment and the chain and cogwheel the area's industrial heritage. Likewise the bollards, rope and quayside. The blue wavy line is the River Irwell. The (worker) bees found on the supporters represent Manchester. On the crest the lion represents bravery, strength and valour, the shuttle underneath the hind paw represents industry. The firebasket represents truth and knowledge. These replaced a previous grant of arms and crest originally granted to the Royal Technical College Salford on 15 December 1959 and transferred to the University of Salford on 19 March 1968. Escutcheon: Azure a sun of sixteen rays within and conjoining the links of a circular chain Or; on a chief gold a lion passant guardant proper between two roses gules barbed and seeded proper. Crest: On a wreath of the colours, A demi lion argent, collared vair, supporting a lance proper, flying therefrom a forked pennon per fesse of the first and azure charged in the hoist with a rose as in the Arms. Motto Altiora Petamus (Let us seek higher things); The basis of the shield is the blue field and gold chief of the Salford City Arms. A gold sun within a chain represents the harnessing and control of natural forces. The sun is also appropriate as a symbol of enlightenment; it was also one of the royal badges of Henry IV, with whose accession Salford became a royal manor. The chain also appears in the City Arms around the supporters' necks. On the gold chief is a lion in natural colours, as in the crest of the Lancashire County Council. This is derived from the royal lions in the Duchy Arms and is an allusion to the Royal title of the College. The crest resembled that of the city with necessary differences. The lion has a collar of vair which is taken from the lions which support the County Council Arms. Instead of a blue rectangular flag with shuttle of the City Arms the lance has the more correct type of ensign for lances, a forked pennon which carries the Lancastrian colours and red rose. | |
| | Stirling, granted 10 June 1967 Escutcheon: Per fess enarched Vert and barr‑wavy Azure and Argent a bow‑arched bridge of seven arches in fess Argent ensigned with a tower of the last, masoned sable, window Gules. between three open books two and one proper, fore‑edges and binding Or; Motto: Innovation and excellence The wavy blue and silver lines refer to the River Forth and the bridge to Stirling Old Bridge. The tower references the Wallace Monument and symbolically safety and guardianship. The open books represent learning. | |
| | Strathclyde, granted 7 December 1964 Escutcheon: Per pale, Gules and Azure, a saltire Argent cantoned between an antique crown in chief Or and three cinquefoils Ermine in the flanks and base; on a chief Or a wave-packet Sable between two open books proper, fore-edges and binding of the First; Crest: A Sallet Proper lined Gules with a Mountling Gules doubled Argent, and on a Wreath of Liveries is set for Crest a terrestrial Sphere Azure, the lines of longitude and latitude Or, ensigned of a three masted sailing ship Proper and in an Escrol over same this Motto Useful Learning; Supporters: Two falcons Proper each gorged of an Antique crown Or. Motto: The place of useful learning The arms contain elements of those of two predecessor institution the Royal College of Science and Technology and the Scottish College of Commerce. The royal crown and Scottish saltire are from the former and the books representing learning are from the latter. The wave packet linking the books indicates technology. The three cinquefoils and the partial red background of the shield reference the ancient kingdom of Strathclyde and the blue background modern Scotland. The crown signifies both the ancient kingdom and a royal connection through the grant of royal status to then Royal Technical College in 1912. | |
| | Surrey, granted 5 October 1966 Escutcheon: Or, three swords palewise, points downwards, gules; on a chief - sable a pale checky azure and Or between two woolpacks argent Crest On a wreath Or and azure, A stag trippant proper, resting the dexter forehoof on a key Or The chief has woolpacks referring to the arms of the borough of Guildford. The blue and yellow chequers are from the arms of the Earl of Surrey. The three swords are also found on the arms of former institution Battersea Polytechnic, and link to the arms of the city of London. On the crest the stag represents the medieval royal hunting park on which the main campus was built. The key is a heraldic symbol of learning. | |
| | Sussex, granted 15 March 1962 Escutcheon: Argent, on a chevron per pale Azure and Gules six martlets Or, between in chief two Saxon- crowns and in base a dolphin naiant Sable. Crest: On a wreath Argent and Gules, Two dolphins embowed, heads downwards, enfiled by a Saxon crown Or. Supporters: On either side a pelican in her piety Proper standing upon a book Gules, edged Or, each supporting a staff also Proper, that on the dexter flying a banner of the second charged with a lion passant guardant Gold dimidiating the hull of an ancient ship Argent, and that on the sinister flying a banner of the second charged with a stag's head caboshed Silver. Motto: Be still and know The arms of the counties of East Sussex and West Sussex are represented both in the red and blue chevrons and the six martlets. The saxon crowns represent the ancient Kingdom of Sussex. The dolphins in the shield and crest are taken from the arms of Brighton. The pelican supporters represent piety or dedication and books they are standing on education. | |
| | Warwick, granted 5 October 1966 Escutcheon: Quarterly Gules and Sable; In the first quarter, an Elephant statant, on the back a Castle triple towered Or; In the second and third quarters, representations of the two Isotopes of Lithium, that in the second quarter having six and that in the third seven Protons and neutrons in its nucleus, with Electrons in orbit Argent: In the fourth quarter, a Bear and Ragged Staff Argent, muzzled Gules collared and chained Or; On a Chief Argent, a representation of a DNA Double Helix, spirals Azure, lined Gules, with connecting Lines Or. Crest: On a Wreath of the Colours, the Mantling Gules, doubled Or, an Open Book bound and clasped Argent, the pages Or, inscribed thereon in Roman Capitals Sable MENS AGITAT MOLEM, and resting on a book fesswise Argent, the fore edge to the front Or. Motto: Mens Agitat Molem (Mind Moves Matter) The chief shows a DNA double helix representing science, likewise the atoms of isotopes of lithium in the quarters. The bear and ragged staff represents Warwickshire and the elephant and castle Coventry. The scroll below generally shows the Latin name of the university Universitas Warwickensis. | |
| | York, granted 20 June 1962 Escutcheon: Azure, on a chevron ermine three books fessewise, each with two clasps downwards, Or. Crest: On a wreath Or and azure, Out of a mural crown argent, masoned sable, two keys in saltire Or and silver, wards upward and outward, surmounted by a rose also argent, barbed and seeded proper. Motto: In Limine Sapientiae (On the threshold of wisdom) | |

=== 1980s Universities ===
| Arms | University | Full Achievement |
|---|---|---|
| | Buckingham, granted November 1986 Escutcheon: Azure a Pall reversed between in chief two Bucks Heads caboshed Gold and in base three Bars Wavy Argent; Crest: Upon a Helm with a Wreath of the colours a Swan wings elevated and addorsed proper and statant within a Branch of Beech enarched Gold; Motto: Alis Volans Propriis (Flying on our own wings) Note: The university uses the swan (a symbol of Buckinghamshire) of its crest as a logo. | |
| | Ulster, granted 2 March 1985 Escutcheon: Per fess Gules and Argent a Pale countercharged over all an Ancient Lamp enflamed Or ensigned by a dexter Hand appaumy couped at the wrist Gules all within an Orle countercharged Or and Gules; Crest: Upon a Helm a Wreath Argent and Gules Two Salmon leaping in saltire in front of a Branch of Yew Or fructed Gules Mantled Gules doubled Argent; Supporters: Dexter an Irish Elk and sinister an Antelope both Argent armed Or and wreathed about the neck with a Torse therefrom a Line reflexed over the back and ending in a Tassel Argent and Gules The six alternating red and white panels represent the six counties of Northern Ireland. The red hand is a symbol of the province of Ulster. The lamp represents enlightenment and learning. One of the supporters is an antelope which links to the supporters of the arms of the dukedom of Abercorn. The other supporter is an Irish elk also found as a supporter on the arms of Northern Ireland. | |

=== Post-1992 Universities ===
| Arms | University | Full Achievement |
|---|---|---|
| | Abertay, granted 25 July 1953 to predecessor Dundee Technical College Escutcheon: Parted perfess, in chief tierced. 1st Ermine, a chevron engrailed between three mullets Gules; 2nd Azure, three chevronels Or; 3rd Argent, a spray of oak Proper fructed Or between three pheons Azure, in base Azure, a pot of three flowering lilies Argent between two flanches Or each charged with a book of Gules; Motto: Beatus homo qui invenit sapientiam (Blessed is the one who finds wisdom) The pot of lilies is taken from the arms of the City and Royal Burgh of Dundee, and the two books are included to mark the educational nature of the institute. The arms of the Baxter family and those of the Dalgleish family (both benefactors) are shown in the top left and top right segments respectively, while the chevrons between them represent technical work. | |
| | Anglia Ruskin, granted 2 February 1994 to Anglia Polytechnic University Escutcheon: Per fess Vert and Gules two Saxon Crowns Or on a Bordure engrailed Azure fimbriated Or four Garbs alternating with as many Bezants pierced of the field also Gold; Crest: Upon a Helm with a Wreath Or and Gules A Saxon Crown Or issuing therefrom a Demi Lion rampant guardant Gules crowned with a Saxon Crown Gold and charged with Bezants Pierced. Supporters: On either side a Heron proper gorged of a Saxon Crown Or standing upon a grassy compartment proper. Motto: Excellentia per Societatem (Excellence through partnership) The blue border represents the East Anglian region, surrounded by the sea. The sheaves of wheat represent agriculture. Gold roundels represent industry. The heron is the main symbol of the university, shown in the arms as both sinister and dexter supporter. The saxon crowns symbolise East Anglia. | |
| | Birmingham City, granted to predecessor City of Birmingham College of Commerce 5 June 1963. Escutcheon: Azure, a band of lozenges conjoined between two torches bendwise Or enflamed proper. Crest: Within a circlet of eight bezants, an heraldic tiger statant gules, crined and tufted Or. Motto: Age Quod Agis (Do what you are doing) | |
| | Bournemouth, granted 27 November 1992 Escutcheon: Azure, three Talbots courant in pale Or on a Chief of the last three Saxon Crowns Gules; Crest: Upon a Helm with a wreath Or and Gules issuant from a Saxon Crown Or a Cubit Arm proper vested Or holding in the hand a Parchment proper. Mantled Gules doubled Or. Supporters: On the dexter side a hind Azure and on the sinister side a Dragon Gules both crowned with a Saxon Crown Gold. Motto: Discere Mutari Est (To learn is to change) The talbots, the heraldic beasts on the shield, represent the location of the main campus on Talbot Heath. The crowns denote the three Saxon crowns of the Kingdom of Wessex, and the nearby boroughs. The blue represents the nearby sea, reflecting the location of the university, on the Jurassic Coast of Dorset. The supporters are derived from those of Hampshire and Dorset County Councils. The hind stands for Hampshire, a stag being one of the County supporters. The dragon is for Dorset. They are coloured blue and red to match the colour scheme of the Arms. The scroll represents learning. | |
| | Coventry, granted 28 September 1993 Escutcheon: Azure issuant from the base a Phoenix Argent the flames Or and from the chief a demi-Sun in splendour of the last Crest: Upon a Helm with a wreath Or and Azure, Upon an Escarbuncle Azure the fleur de lis Or a Terrestrial Globe Azure irradiated Gold the land masses Argent. Mantled Azure doubled Or; Supporters: On the dexter side a Horse Argent and on the sinister side a Bear Or each supporting between the forelegs a lance Gold flying outwards therefrom a triangular Pennon Azure that to the dexter charged with a Book spine outwards Argent closed upon a clasp Or and that to the sinister with a Cogwheel Argent. Motto: Arte et Industria (By art and industry) The phoenix, rising from flames, represents the revival of Coventry following the city's devastation during the Second World War. The phoenix is also a supporter of the arms of the city of Coventry. The sun represents enlightenment i.e. education. The dexter supporter is the white horse of Lady Godiva. The sinister supporter is a bear which is a symbol of Warwickshire. Both supporters hold a tilting spear which is a link to the Shakespeare coat of arms. One penant shows a book, the other a cogwheel representing learning in general and technical education. The crest has a globe which shows the university's international outreach. | |
| | Cranfield, granted 1 January 1971 to predecessor Cranfield Institute of Technology Escutcheon: Per chevron barry undy Or and Azure and Azure in base a Torch of three branches Or inflamed proper Crest: Out of an Astral Crown Azure in front of an Owl wings displayed Argent two Keys addorsed wards upwards Or; Supporters: On either side a Crane proper pendant from the neck of each a Crown rayonnée Or the whole on a Compartment composed of a marshy bank with reeds proper Motto: Post Nubes Lux (After clouds light) The university states that "the 'bars undy wavy' in the chief of the shield in combination with the cranes allude to the university's name, Cranfield, which etymologically derives from 'cranuc-feld', meaning a field frequented by Cranes. The three-branched torch in the base refers to learning and knowledge in the sciences of Engineering, Technology and Management. The astral crown in the crest alludes to the College of Aeronautics and also commemorates The Lord Kings Norton as Chancellor, having regard to his contribution to the development of aeronautical research and his links with the college. The keys represent gaining of knowledge by study and instruction and the owl represents knowledge in the widest sense." | |
| | De Montfort, granted to predecessor, Leicester Polytechnic 8 July 1990 Escutcheon: Per fess wavy Gules and Azure Or in chief a Lion passant and in base a Cinquefoil pierced of the field countercharged Crest: upon a Helm with a Wreath Or and Gules Between two Sprigs of Laurel Or a Roundel its obverse and reverse per fess wavy Gules and Azure on the obverse a open Book bound Or leaved Argent; Supporters: On the dexter side a Lion and on the sinister a Kestrel Wings expanded and addorsed all Or upon a Grassy Mound Vert growing therefrom two Roses Gules barbed and seeded proper and stalked and leaved Vert; Motto: Excellentia et studium (Excellence and zeal) The book in the crest represents learning. The lion supporter and cinquefoil are taken from the arms of the city of Leicester. The lion (passant) in the chief references the lion (rampant) of the arms of Simon de Montfort. | |
| | Derby, granted 21 December 1995 Escutcheon: Bleu-Céleste an Orrery Or on a Chief Gules a Cross potent quadrate Argent charged with a Fountain between two Stag's Heads caboshed of the fourth Crest: upon a Helm with a Wreath Or Bleu-Céleste and Gules an Owl wings expanded proper gorged with a Chain Or pendent therefrom a Tudor Rose barbed and seeded proper and resting the dexter claw on an open Book also proper edged and bound Or. Mantled Bleu-Céleste and Gules doubled Or. Supporters: On the Dexter a Buck proper armed, unguled and gorged with a collar of Park Palings Or and supporting a sprig of Broom proper and on the Sinister side a Male Griffin rampant Sable armed and irradiated Or langued Gules gorged with a collar of cogwheels Argent and supporting a miner's pick, head upwards proper. Motto: Experientia docet (Experience is the best teacher) The main charge is an "orrery" or armillary sphere. This alludes to the City of Derby's involvement with science since the seventeenth century when John Flamsteed became Astronomer Royal. It also recalls the painting "The Orrery" by Joseph Wright. The cross potent quadrate and fountain come from the arms of the Diocese of Derby. The earliest forerunner of the present University was the Diocesan College for Training School Mistresses. From 1884 Derby was in the Diocese of Southwell, from whose arms came the fountain, and before that in the Diocese of Lichfield in whose arms the cross originates. All three Dioceses are involved in the governance of the University. The stag's heads come from the arms of Derbyshire County Council, and originally from the arms of the Cavendish family, Dukes of Devonshire. The owl is a symbol of wisdom. He supports an open book, emblematic of learning. Such a book also appeared in the arms of Bishop Lonsdale, after whom another of the University's predecessors - the Derby Lonsdale College of Higher Education - was named. About the owl's neck is a Tudor rose. This has long been a symbol of Derbyshire and is the principal charge in the arms of the County Council. It also appeared in the arms of Matlock College of Education, which merged with Derby Lonsdale college to form Derbyshire College of Higher Education. The buck and park palings are from the arms of the City of Derby. The town's Norse name was Derorby or "Place of the Deer". The broom branch also features in Derby's achievement. The griffin, with cogwheel collar and lead miner's pick, is for Derby's industrial heritage. | |
| | East London, granted 25 April 2013 Escutcheon: Azure a Torch enflamed Or enfiling an Annulet embattled on the outer edge Argent between two Keys in pile the wards upwards and outwards Or on a Chief wavy Argent three Acorns proper. Crest: Upon a Helm with a Wreath Or and Azure Upon a pile of three Closed Books fesswise those at the top and bottom with their spines to the dexter and that in the middle with its spine to the sinister Azure edged and garnished Or a Kylix issuant therefrom a Phoenix Or the flames proper. Supporters: On either side A Phoenix Or the flames proper gorged with an Annulet embattled on the outer edge Azure; Motto: Scientia et votorum impletio (Knowledge and the fulfillment of promises) The supporters are a pair of phoenixes. They represent the rebuilding of the founding institution West Ham Technical Institute in 1900 following a fire. | |
| | Edinburgh Napier, granted to predecessor Napier Technical College 7 June 1965; as Napier University 7 April 1993 Escutcheon: Tierced in pairle reversed; 1st, Argent, a castle triple-towered parted per pale Gules and Sable upon a rock Proper, roofs counterchanged, masoning, two windows and port of the First; 2nd; Gules, on a bend Argent three crescents Azure; 3rd, Argent a saltire engrailed Gules cantoned between four roses of the Second, barbed Vert and seeded Or. Motto Nisi Sapienta Frustra (Without knowledge, everything is in vain) The arms of John Napier of Merchiston (1550-1617), the inventor of logarithms, whose birthplace, Merchiston Castle, is now part of the university are in the top right part of the shield. The arms of the City of Edinburgh, as founders of Napier College, are in the top left. The lower part of the shield shows the modern arms of the Napier family. | |
| | Glasgow Caledonian, granted 31 May 1993 Escutcheon: Per chevron Azure and Argent a saltire Ermine cantoned between in chief two keys in saltire wards uppermost and outwards Or, and in base issuant from a mound Vert an oak tree Proper and on the top of the tree a red breast also Proper; on a chief Or a book expanded Proper, binding and fore-edges Gules, between two lions combatant Sable, armed and langued Gules; Motto: For the common weal The arms combine elements of two founding colleges: Glasgow College of Technology (later Glasgow Polytchnic) and The Queen's College, Glasgow. The oak tree and robin refer to St Mungo the patron saint of Glasgow and were borrowed from the arms of Glasgow Polytechnic, likewise the book of knowledge. The saltire ermine and the crossed keys (intended to represent the "unlocking" of the book of knowledge) were taken from the arms of The Queen's College. | |
| | Hertfordshire, granted 30 September 1992 Escutcheon: Purpure a Fess conjoined to two Flaunches Argent between in chief a Representation of the Constellation Perseus consisting of six Mullets and in base an Oak Tree couped and fructed Gold; Crest: Within an Astral Crown Or a Phoenix Sable in flames proper beaked Gold and gorged with a Wreath of Laurel Vert Mantled Purpure and Sable doubled Argent; Supporters: On either side a Hart Gules attired and unguled Or gorged with a Riban per fess Purpure and Sable pendant therefrom by a ring an Annulet embattled on the outer edge Gold enfiled by a Quill that on the dexter bendwise and that on the sinister bendwise sinister Argent and resting the interior hind hoof on a covered Cup Or the Compartments comprising Water barry wavy Argent and Azure between two Grassy Mounts Proper; Motto: Quaere scientiam tota vita (Seek knowledge throughout life) The shield is charged with an oak tree taken from the coat of arms of the former Hatfield Rural District, the constellation Perseus (containing the binary star Algol) and a representation of the letter "H" recalling the emblem of the former Hatfield Polytechnic. The crest, a Phoenix rising from an astral crown, represents the university's evolution from a technical college training apprentices for the aviation industry. The two harts supporting the shield represent the county of Hertfordshire, with the covered cups referring to A.S. Butler, who donated the land upon which the original campus was built | |
| | Huddersfield, Arms and crest granted 4 February 1972 to predecessor institution Huddersfield Polytechnic. Supporters granted 1995. Escutcheon: Or an open Book proper bound Sable on the dexter page the word Trivium and on the sinister the word Quadrivium in letters Sable on a Chief of the last a Tower between two Rams passant Argent; Crest: upon a Helm with a Wreath Or and Sable A Ram sejant affrontly Argent gorged with a Collar Sable horned and unguled Or and supporting before itself an open Book proper bound Sable charged on the dexter page with a fleur de lys and on the sinister with a Teasel Cob slipped Gules Mantled Sable doubled Or. Supporters: On either side a lion Or winged Sable, that on the dexter charged on the shoulder with a torch palewise also sable enflamed proper, that on the sinister charged on the shoulder with a Terrestrial Globe Gules the land masses Sable. Motto: Sic Vos Non Vobis (Thus not for you alone) The open book represents learning and the Latin text thereupon is the quadrivium and trivium of classical education. The tower represents landmark Castle Hill. The rams are symbols of the town and refer to the Ramsden family, property owners of the locality. | |
| | Kingston, granted 16 June 1993 Escutcheon: Per fess wavy Erminois and Bleu Celeste in chief an Open Book proper bound Sable each page charged with two Keys bendwise their bows interlaced wards upwards and outwards also Sable and in base a Saxon Crown Gold; Crest: upon a Helm with a Wreath Or and Bleu Celeste Upon the charred Stock of an Elm Tree sprouting proper an Owl guardant Or holding in the dexter claw a Quill palewise Bleu Celeste penned Gold. Mantled Bleu Celeste Doubled Or; Supporters: On the dexter a Lion and on the sinister a Hind Or each gorged with a Saxon Crown Bleu Celeste and resting the interior foot on the charred Stump of an Oak Tree sprouting and fructed proper the Compartment comprising a Grassy Mount and in base a Fess wavy Bleu Celeste charged with three Salmon naiant Argent finned and tailed Gules. Motto: Per Scientiam Progredimur (Through learning we progress) Erminois signifies the royal connection of Kingston. The book represents teaching and learning and is taken from the arms of the College of Technology that preceded the University. The left page represents the past and the right, the future. The two keys on the left page are taken from the arms of the county of Surrey (of which Kingston used to be a part). They originally came from the arms of the Diocese of Winchester which used to include large parts of Surrey and are now retained in the arms of the Diocese of Guildford. The Bishop of Winchester had a palace out of residence in Kingston, and there is now a pub called the "Bishop out of Residence". The two keys on the other side are the twin keys to learning and opportunity. The crown is the crown of the Saxon kings who were crowned in Kingston (Kings Town) – the coronation stone stands outside the Kingston guildhall. In the crest the owl signifies wisdom and science with a quill pen for arts, letters and commerce. The supporters are a lion signifying strength and the male element balanced by a hind for speed, fleetness of response and female element. The charred stumps of oak trees on which the supporters rest their feet provide links to the former relationships with Kingston and Surrey. The wave at the base of the compartment stands for the river Thames on which Kingston is sited. The three salmon are from the arms of the Royal Borough of Kingston – the Domesday book mentions that Kingston had three fisheries. | |
| | Lancashire, granted 7 October 1995. Escutcheon: Per chevron invected of two points downwards Azure and Or in chief a Paschal Lamb couchant Argent nimbed and supporting a Cross staff Or flying therefrom a Pennon Argent and in base a rose Gules barbed and seeded proper Crest: issuant from a Chaplet of roses sans barbs two being manifest Gules leaves Sable a Lion's Gamb holding a Scroll proper Supporters On either side a Lion guardant proper gorged with a Collar Vair holding in the interior fore paw a Torch Gules enflamed proper and resting the interior hind paw on a Closed Book bound Gules edged and clasped Or the whole upon a compartment comprising a Grassy Mound vert Motto: Ex solo ad solem (From the earth to the sun) The paschal lamb is taken from the arms of the City of Preston. The red rose represents Lancashire - it is placed centrally on the shield to represent 'Central' Lancashire (referencing the university's former name, the University of Central Lancashire). The distinctive division of the shield echoes the architecture of the Harris Institute, a Grade II* listed building and predecessor of the present university. The crest and supporters are the lions of Lancashire County Council's arms - the county council had administered the former polytechnic until 1988. To them have been added symbols of education - flaming torches and a degree scroll. | |
| | Leeds Beckett University, granted 11 January 1994 to Leeds Metropolitan University Escutcheon: Per chevron Argent and Vert in chief two open Books proper bound Gules edged and clasped Or each charged with a Rose Argent seeded Or barbed Vert with slips and leaves surmounting the lower edge also Vert in base a Fountain Or issuing Water Proper. Crest: Upon a Helm with a Wreath Argent & Vert Within a Coronet Or a Mount Vert thereon a Barn Owl displayed between two sprigs of Laurel proper Mantled Vert Doubled Argent. Supporters: Dexter a male Student habited in the Gown Cap and Hood of Leeds Metropolitan University and holding in the dexter hand a Scroll all proper and on the Sinister a female Student habited in a like Gown Hood and Cap and holding in the sinister hand a Scroll all proper. Motto: Victrix Fortunae Sapientia (Wisdom is the conqueror of fortune) | |
| | Lincoln, granted 12 May 2011 Escutcheon: Argent a Pall reversed between in chief two closed Books Azure garnished Or and in base a Garb Azure banded Or. Crest: Upon a Helm with a Wreath Argent and Azure Upon the top of a Gothic Tower Azure a Peregrine Falcon guardant close Or. Supporters: On either side a Swan Argent holding in the beak a Fleur de Lys Gules. Motto: Libertas per Sapientiam (Freedom through wisdom) On the arms the blue reversed pall represents regional waterways and also the joining of local institutions to form the university. The books represent knowledge and the wheatsheaf agricultural heritage. On the crest the tower is a symbol of Lincoln cathedral and the falcon of strength and flight. The fleur-de-lys held by the swan supporters represent the city of Lincoln. The swans reference Saint Hugh of Lincoln. | |
| | Liverpool John Moores, granted 16 September 1989 Escutcheon: Barry wavy of six Argent and Azure three Cormorants rising wings addorsed Sable sans legs beaked Or and each enfiling a Mercantile Crown Or; Crest: Upon a helm with a Wreath Argent and Gules a Sea Owl displayed Sable beaked and the piscine parts Or; Supporters: Dexter a Peregrine Falcon and Sinister a Raven each statant on a Doctoral Hat upon a compartment comprising a grassy mount all proper Motto: Audentes fortuna juvat (Fortune favours the bold) The three cormorants ('liver birds') and crowns represent the city of Liverpool and its mercantile traditions. The waves symbolise a maritime connection. The cormorant and sea waves both feature in the arms of the city of Liverpool. The owl in the crest represents wisdom. It is a sea owl with the lower part of the body represented as a fish, a traditional heraldic convention used to symbolise a maritime connection. | |
| | London South Bank, granted 1970 to predecessor Polytechnic of the South Bank Escutcheon: Gules the net of a half dodecahedron Or, and on a Chief Argent two Thames sailing Barges the dexter contourny Sable. Crest: On a Wreath of the Colours In front of a Dolphin embowed Azure an open Book proper edged Or bound Gules. Motto: Do it with thy might The field of the arms is red as it is the predominant colour in the arms of the London Borough of Southwark. The polygon symbolises the word 'polytechnic'. The number of sides and subsidiary polygons is irrelevant, the aim being to convey 'many' or 'poly'. The two sprit-sail Thames barges were typical of this stretch of the river. The dolphin in the crest is derived from the decoration on lamp posts on the Thames Embankment. To this has been added an open book, symbolising education. | |
| | Manchester Metropolitan, granted 29 May 1991 to predecessor Manchester Polytechnic Escutcheon: Chequy Sable and Or, a Flame proper; a Chief Or semée of spade irons conjoined in hexagon and alternating voided of the first. Crest: Upon a Helm with a wreath Or and Sable A Lion rampant holding in the claws a Globe semée of Bees all Or Mantled Sable doubled Or. Supporters: On the either side an Heraldic Antelope respectant Or, flames proper issuing from the mouth. Motto: Many arts, many skills The symbols in the chief each consist of up to six 'spade-irons' (metal blades of spades) and are symbols of hard work and link to Manchester's cultural and physical landscape. The chequerboard symbolises opportunity and the variety of academic disciplines available. The flame represents a burning enthusiasm for learning. In the crest the lion references the arms of the city of Manchester. Likewise the globe covered with bees. The latter representing industriousness and the former internationalism and a global student body. The antelope supporters, breathing flames of knowledge, reference the Manchester arms but are outward looking in pursuit of knowledge and opportunity. | |
| | Middlesex uses a logo based on the arms of Middlesex County Council which was abolished in 1965. The county council arms were based on the traditional arms of the Kingdom of the East and Middle Saxons, as used by the Essex and Middlesex counties. In the case of Middlesex, a Saxon crown was added at the time of the grant. Prior to the adoption of the logo the university used an unofficial coat of arms comprising a red shield bearing three seaxes with a white bar dancetty forming a letter 'M' in chief, and a crest comprising a Saxon crown in front of an open book. | |
| | Northumbria, granted 9 November 1995 Escutcheon: Per fess enarched and embattled Argent and Gules in chief two Castles triple-towered also Gules and in base an open Book Or; Crest: Upon a Helm with a Wreath Argent and Gules A Lion sejant affronty Or holding in the dexter forepaw a Torch Azure enflamed proper and supporting with the sinister forepaw a Trident also Azure; Supporters: On either side a Sea-horse the head neck and forelegs Argent the piscine parts Bleu céleste dorsally finned Or gorged with a Mural Crown Gules and supporting between the forelegs a Trident erect Azure; Motto: Aetas Discendi (The age of learning) The university states 'Northumbria's shield contains two triple-towered castles, representing the City of Newcastle upon Tyne, and an open book which represents learning. The arched line of battlements dividing the shield refers to the Roman Wall, a historic feature of Northumberland. Whilst the curve of the arch reflects the King George the Fifth Bridge over the River Tyne, more generally the bridge alludes to the university's role in the transmission of knowledge to, and strong links, with the society in which its located.' The crest is a lion grasping a flaming torch which is an emblem of learning, also a trident as the emblem of the old god of the River Tyne. The supporters are seahorses referencing the arms of Newcastle upon Tyne but with the addition of crowns around their necks, alluding to the Roman Wall and holding tridents of the River Tyne. | |
| | Nottingham Trent, granted 18 July 1973 Escutcheon: Crest: Supporters: The arms are on a green field divided by a river with an oak tree above the river and a version of a raguley cross below the river. There is therefore, representation of both city (the cross) and county (the tree) and the position of the University on both banks of the river. The supporters are a stag (the city) and a lioness (the county) although the style, colouring and collars are quite different to those used by the municipal authorities. The crest is a phoenix arising from the flames which can be interpreted as the birth of the University or as a reference to D.H.Lawrence who studied at the former University College in the Arkwright Building and who used the phoenix as a publishing symbol. | |
| | Plymouth, granted 10 April 2008 Escutcheon: Crest: Supporters: Motto: Indagate Fingite Invenite (Explore, dream, discover) The two gold open books represent the university's focus on learning and scholarship. The scattering of small stars represents navigation, which has played a key role in the history of the city and the university. The scallop shells in gold represent pilgrimage, a sign of the importance of the departure of the Pilgrim Fathers from the Barbican aboard the Mayflower in 1620. A Pelican and a Golden Hind support the shield and reflect both the original and later, better known, name of Sir Francis Drake's ship. The crest contains the Latin motto Indagate Fingite Invenite ('Explore Dream Discover'), a quote from Mark Twain, reflecting the university's ambitions for its students and Plymouth's history of great seafarers. | |
| | Portsmouth, granted to Portsmouth Polytechnic 8 June 1982, transferred by Royal Licence to the University of Portsmouth 17 October 2017. Escutcheon: Azure on a pale between two cotises engrailed on the outer edge argent three crescents azure each ensigned by a rose gules seeded gold Crest: A sea-centaur argent bearded crined and the piscine parts azure and holding aloft with both hands a torch palewise gules enfladed proper Supporters: On the dexter side a Sea Lion guardant Or the tail proper the dorsal and caudal fins Or on the sinister side a Sea Unicorn Argent armed crined and unguled Or the tail proper the dorsal and caudal fins Or; Motto: Lucem Sequamur (Let us follow the light) The arms combine the Hampshire rose with the Portsmouth crescent on a central white band. The blue field is intended to represent the sea and the vertical white band the path of learning. The crest depicts a sea-centaur bearing a flaming torch. In mythology Cheiron the centaur was responsible for the education of many characters. A sea-centaur has never before been used in a heraldic device and thus provides a unique creature which appropriately combines the sea and learning. The creature is depicted with a flaming torch as a further allusion to education. The tinctures of the crest reflect those of the escutcheon in the interest of unity of design. The supporters, a maritime version of the royal supporters ie lion and unicorn, are also a reference to the arms of the city of Portsmouth. | |
| | Robert Gordon, granted 14 May 1993 Escutcheon: Azure, three boars' heads couped Or, langued Gules; Sinister, Gules, a tower triple-towered Argent, masoned Sable, windows and port of the last; overall on a pale wavy Sable fimbriated Argent, a cogwheel Or, a torch of the last enflamed Proper, and a bezant; all within a bordure Or. Motto: Omni Nunc Arte Magistra (Now by all your mastered arts) The three boar heads are taken from the arms of Clan Gordon. The tower is taken from the arms of Aberdeen. The wavy pale has symbols for engineering (wheel), learning (torch) and finance (bezant). | |
| | Sheffield Hallam, granted 25 February 1993 Escutcheon: Per saltire Azure and Vert a sheaf of six arrows Argent barbed and flighted Or interlaced saltirewise surmounted by an open book proper edged Or between in pale two roses Argent barbed and seeded proper and in fess as many garbs Or. Crest: Upon a Helm with a wreath Or and Azure a rose Argent barbed and seeded proper each petal charged with a closed book the spine inwards Gules the outer corners and clasps Gold. Mantled Azure doubled Or. Motto: Learn and serve The two white roses of York on the escutcheon and that also on the crest represent Yorkshire. The book represents learning. The arrows are a symbol of the city of Sheffield and are found on the latter's coat of arms. The sheaves, although representing growth, here shown on a green background ie a field, are part of a wordplay on the city's name. The same wordplay is made on the city's arms. | |
| | Staffordshire, granted 31 March 2025 Escutcheon: Argent a Pall reversed Gules surmounted in chief by an Open Book Or bound Azure and in base by a Stafford Knot Or. Crest: Upon the Capital of an Ionic Column Gules charged with a Stafford Knot an Owl affronty Or. Supporters: On either side a Swallow proper. Motto: Sapere Aude (Dare to know) The reversed pall ('inverted Y') represents the conjoining of various institutions to form the current university. The open book represents learning. The Stafford knot on both the escutcheon and crest is a traditional symbol of the county of Staffordshire. The red and white colouring link to the Stoke-on-Trent city arms. The owl represents Athena goddess of wisdom. The swallow supporters represent the students and knowledge they bring from elsewhere in the world.); Note: the Stafford knot (and colour scheme) of the escutcheon is used as the university's logo | |
| | Sunderland, granted at unknown date Escutcheon: Gyronny Or and Azure charged with a Sun in Splendour Or on a Chief Azure two Keys in saltire wards upward and outward between two Mitres Gold; Crest: Upon a Helm with a Wreath Or and Azure A Lymphad Sable the Sail charged with the Arms Mantled Azure doubled Or; Supporters: On the Dexter side a male Griffin sergeant reguardant Or and on the Sinister side a Lion rampant reguardant Argent each gorged with a collar gold dependent therefrom a Roundel Gyronny Orand Azure charged with a Sun in Splendour Gold. Motto: Scientiam Dulce Hauriens (Sweetly absorbing knowledge) The university states that on the crest the ship represents a maritime connection. On the escutcheon chief are bishop's mitres referencing the localities of Bishopwearmouth and Monkwearmouth and St Peter's keys. The sun represents the light of learning and is a wordplay on Sunderland. Eight gyrons behind the sun reference many courses of study offered. The gryphon supporter signifies wisdom and looks to the future. The lion is adopted from the coat of arms of County Durham. The motto is taken from the closing player to the Venerable Bede's Ecclesiastical History of the English People. | |
| | Teesside, granted 22 June 1993 Escutcheon: Or on a Pale between two Lions combattant Azure an Open Book of the field between in chief a Rose Argent barbed and seeded proper and in base a Lymphad also Or; Crest: upon a Helm with a Wreath Or and Azure a Lion rampant guardant Azure supporting an Anchor erect Sable the shank piercing a rose as in the Arms Mantled Azure lined Or; Supporters: On the dexter a Lion rampant Azure and on the sinister a Peregrine falcon close proper each charged with a Rose Argent barbed and seeded pierced by an anchor proper Motto: Facta Non Verba (Deeds not words) The shield includes a white rose of Yorkshire, a ship representing the town's maritime heritage and a book (learning). The crest includes an anchor, also a maritime reference. | |
| | Westminster, granted 17 May 1993. Escutcheon: Murrey a Portcullis chained argent on a Chief also Argent an open Book Murrey its pages Argent and inscribed with the word Veritas Sable between two Tudor Roses barbed and seeded proper. Crest: Upon a Helm with a Wreath Argent and Murrey A demi-Lion Murrey winged Argent grasping with the dexter foreclaw a Battle Axe in bend sinister Murrey its blade Argent and resting the sinister forepaw on a Book Murrey charged on the front board with a Portcullis chained Argent. Mantled Murrey Doubled Argent. Supporters: Dexter a Ram Argent gorged with an eastern crown Murrey and supporting a representation of the Lord High Chancellor's Mace Or; Sinister A Lion rampant Or supporting a Tilting Spear Argent; a Compartment of grass proper and water barry wavy Argent and Azure. Motto: The Lord is our strength The portcullis is the symbol of Westminster whilst the open book symbolises learning. The Tudor roses, a royal emblem, symbolise the UK monarch who traditionally acts as patron of the university. In the crest the demi lion with battle axe comes from the arms of Sir George Cayley. He founded the Royal Polytechnic Institution in 1838 on the site of the present University's Regent Street campus. Cayley was an engineer and inventor and pioneer aviator, hence the wings added to the lion. The lion supports a book charged with a portcullis. The ram supporter comes from the arms of Quniton Hogg's grandson, Lord Hailsham, Lord High Chancellor. The Hogg family continued their association with the University through four generations. The lion with a tilting spear comes from the Studd family arms. | |
| | West of England, granted 4 November 1993 Escutcheon: Crest: Supporters: Motto: Light liberty learning The arms are derived from those of a predecessor institution St Matthias College (itself formerly Gloucester and Bristol Diocesan Training Institution for School Mistresses). The crest links to another predecessor institution, the Merchant Venturers' Navigation School. The firebasket in the ship's rigging represents guidance, hope and a desire for learning. The unicorn supporter is taken from the arms of the city of Bristol. The other supporter is a sea stag and is from the arms of the former county of Avon. Both supporters wear on the neck the crown of King Edgar, referencing the monarch's association with Bath Abbey and hence the region. The supporters' epaulets symbolise fountains of knowledge and learning. Both supporters also hold an apple tree: the tree of knowledge. | |
| | West of Scotland, granted 28 March 2017 Escutcheon: Or, two torches saltireways Sable, enflamed Gules cantoned between in chief an abbot's mitre Proper, in base a terrestrial globe Proper and in the flanks two books Proper, bindings and fore-edges Gules, the dexter charged with a mullet Gules and the sinister charged with a bell Or, with a base branch of laurel in bend and a branch of holly in bend sinister conjoined Proper; Motto: Doctrina Prosperitas (Learning is success) | |
| | Wolverhampton, granted October 1994 Escutcheon: Between two Chevrons Couped inverted and conjoined, three pairs of Keys Saltire Wards upwards and outwards, two in chief and one in base Azure; Crest: Upon a Helm with a Wreath of the Colours Rising from behind an open book, proper edged or bound Gules each page, charged with a sprigg of three Hazel Nuts all slipped and involucred Azure, a demi Sun in splendour Gold mantled Azure doubled Supporters: The supporter on the dexter side a representation of Thomas Telford (1757–1834), civil engineer, proper habited Azure. On the sinister a representation of Lady Wulfrun proper habited Azure, holding in the sinister hand a Deed partially unrolled or pendent there from a Seal Gules as the same are in the margin hereof more plainly depicted Motto: Innovation and opportunity In the crest there is the sun representing enlightenment and a book representing learning. The three crossed keys in the escutcheon link to the crossed keys on the crest of the arms of the city of Wolverhampton as well as being a symbol of learning. The chevrons form the initial 'W' of Wolverhampton. One of the supporters is engineer Thomas Telford, the other Wulfrun the Anglo-Saxon founder of the city. | |

=== 21st century universities ===
| Arms | University | Full Achievement |
|---|---|---|
| | Aberystwyth, granted 7 May 1938 to predecessor University College Wales Escutcheon: Per chevron Or and vert in chief two dragons combatant gules, armed and langued azure, and in base an open book proper Crest On a wreath of the colours, A castle battlement in flames, arising therefrom an eagle, all proper Motto: Nid Byd, Byd Heb Wybodaeth (A world without knowledge is no world at all) The two red dragons symbolise the optimism of Victorian north and south Wales and the open book symbolises the world of learning. The phoenix in the crest represents rebuilding after a fire in 1885. | |
| | Bangor, granted 25 September 1978 to predecessor University College of North Wales Escutcheon: Quarterly Or and Gules on a Pale Ermine between four lions passant guardant counterchanged a lion rampant Or. Crest: In front of an open book proper a dragon passant Gules between two leeks proper Motto: Gorau Dawn Deall (The best gift is knowledge) The arms are partially derived from those Llywelyn prince of Gwynedd, also found in the Royal Badge of Wales. The university however has inserted a 'pale' (vertical strip) with an additional (fifth) lion, in this case 'rampant' which may loosely reference the arms of the Kingdom of Powys. A gold lion on an ermine background also features in the arms of Lord Penrhyn, an early contributor to the university. There is a similarity also to the arms of Owain Glyndŵr. However four Bangor lions are 'passant' (walking) rather than rampant as seen on the former's arms. The pale distinguishes the arms from those of Wrexham University. The university's logo shows the pale in white (argent) and adds the figures '1884' at the base. The ermine pale can be seen on the arms emblazoned upon the university mace and the university flag. The arms adopted in 1885 by Bangor's predecessor institution, the University College of North Wales", were different from these, being described as: "To the right of the four lions of Gwynedd ('passant guardant counterchanged') was the lion of Powysland, described as 'a ruddy lion ramping in gold' ... The Welsh people in general were represented by the Red Dragon of Cadwaladr and by the leek." In the 1885 design the leeks acted as supporters and the dragon as a crest. | |
| | Birmingham Newman, granted 6 November 1987 to predecessor Newman College of Education Escutcheon: Crest: Supporters: Motto: Ex Umbris In Veritatem (From the shadows to the truth) In the chief there are two St Chad's crosses. Chad represents the ancient kingdom of Mercia as well as the religious foundations of the university. The wavy line is taken from John Henry Newman's own arms. The wolf is a wordplay on the name Wulfwine, who is the area's first recorded landowner. | |
| | Birmingham (University College), granted 20 September 1962 (to the Lord Mayor, Aldermen and Citizens of the City of Birmingham for the use of The Birmingham College of Food and Domestic Arts); transferred by royal licence 22 December 2014 Escutcheon: Per chevron Gules and Or a Chevronel Sable between in chief two Roundels Argent the dexter charged with a Garb and the sinister with a Boar's Head couped at the neck proper and in base a Flame of Fire between two Sprigs of Bay the stems crossed in base proper tied with a Riband Gules. Crest: Upon a Helm with a Wreath Or and Azure Out of a Mural Crown Or a dexter Arm embowed proper vested Bleu Celeste cuffed Argent the hand grasping a Cornucopia mouth downwards proper. Mantled Azure lined Or. Supporters: On the dexter side a Bull and on the sinister side a Bear both Or murally gorged Azure. Motto: Service before self | |
| | Bishop Grosseteste, granted 26 June 1969 to predecessor Bishop Grosseteste College of Education Escutcheon: Azure, a bend ermine; over all on a cross moline Or a leopard's face gules jessant-de-lys vert Crest: On a wreath Or, azure and vert, A demi lion pean, the head gules, gorged with a collar gemel and supporting a crosier the head enclosing a cross moline square-pierced Or; Motto: Ne omnia sibi habeat (Not all things to oneself) The ermine diagonal is a reference to the Roman road between London and Lincoln Ermine Street. The central figure of the arms is a jessant-de-lys - a leopard's face with a fleur-de-lys in the open mouth. The fleur-de-lys is from the arms of the city of Lincoln. The cross moline is from arms of Robert Grosseteste. The bishop's crozier which is part of the crest also references the latter. The lion references the arms of the Sibthorp family, early patrons of the then college. Note: The university uses part of the escutcheon of the arms of the diocese of Lincoln, as its logo. | |
| | Buckinghamshire New, granted to predecessor institution i.e. Buckinghamshire Institute of Higher Education 4 January 1998 Escutcheon: Murray two Haunches vert fimbriated and conjoined to a Barrulet dancetty of two points downward Argent between in chief a Swan proper gorged with a Coronet and holding in the dexter foot a Torch Or enflamed proper and in base a like Swan contourny holding in the sinister foot a Botcher's chisel Or the blade proper Crest: Upon a helm with a Wreath Argent A Mount Vert thereon between two Wheels Or a Beech Tree proper Motto: Arte et Industria (Art and Industry) The swan is a symbol of Buckinghamshire. One swan holds in its foot a torch a symbol of enlightenment and education. Another swan holds a chisel linked to the local furniture industry and a craft once known as bodging. Note: the university logo is a modification (reduction) of the above | |
| | Built Environment, Arms and crest granted to a predecessor institution the College of Estate Management 24 June 1929 Escutcheon: Or, two pallets azure; over all on a fesse engrailed sable a garb of the field between two open books argent edged gold. Crest: On a wreath of the colours, An owl perched upon the battlements of a tower proper between two sprigs of oak also proper fructed Or. Supporters: Motto: Ex Cultu Robur (Strength through knowledge) The colour blue represents truth and gold elevation of the mind. The lion shows courage and the beaver perseverance. The helmet stands for wisdom, likewise the books and the owl. Alongside the owl are sprigs of oak with acorns, symbolising strength and growth. The wheatsheaf signifies the harvesting of one's hopes. | |
| | Canterbury, Christ Church, granted at 1 November 1991 to Canterbury Christ Church University College. Escutcheon: Per pale bleu celeste and gules four cross crosslets argent one and two and one a canton argent fimbriated sable charged with a cornish chough proper Crest: Motto: Veritas liberabit vos (The truth shall set you free) The four crosses in the arms demonstrate that the university is a church foundation. In the top left-hand corner is the red-billed (Cornish) chough which occurs in the attributed arms of Thomas Becket (and the city of Canterbury). In the crest the lion from the arms of the city of Canterbury stands upon a grassy mound surrounded by gold Canterbury crosses. The motto comes from St John's Gospel. | |
| | Cardiff, granted 9 July 1990 to University of Wales College Cardiff Escutcheon: Gules three Chevrons and in chief an open Book Or bound Argent the dexter page charged with a crescent and the sinister with an embattled Annulet both Gules all within a Bordure Argent. Crest: Upon a Helm with a Wreath Or and Gules A Dragon affronty wings expanded Gules the dexter wing charged with a Crescent and the sinister with an embattled Annulet both Gold. Supporters: On the dexter side an Angel proper habited Argent sandalled winged and crined Gold and on the sinister side a Dragon Gules. Motto: Gwirionedd, Undod A Chytgord (Truth, unity and concord); Badge: Two dragons wings conjoined Gules interlaced by a crescent Gold. The chevronels in the arms refer to the arms of the de Clare family, who were feudal lords of Glamorgan. The book is a symbol of learning. The crescent and annulet represent the two former institutions i.e. University College Cardiff and University of Wales Institute of Science and Technology that created the current university. | |
| | Cardiff Metropolitan, granted 26 May 1988 to previous institution the South Glamorgan Institute of Higher Education Escutcheon: Crest: Motto: Gorau meddiant gwybodaeth (The most valuable possession is knowledge) Within the escutcheon. the pall ('Y shape') represents the confluence of the three rivers of Cardiff (Taff, Ely, and Rhymney). The dragon in the crest is the symbol of Wales. | |
| | Chester, granted to predecessor Chester Diocesan Training College 5 July 1954. Supporters granted 5 May 2016 Escutcheon: Argent, on a cross gules a garb Or, in the first quarter in front of two swords in saltire proper, hilts and pomels gold, an open book also proper, clasped also gold Crest: On a wreath of the colours, In front of two swords in saltire proper, hilts and pomels Or, a mitre of the last charged with a garb gules Motto: Qui docet in doctrina (He that teacheth, on teaching) The open book is a symbol of learning, The golden wheatsheaf is from the arms of the city of Chester and the county of Cheshire. The crossed swords are also taken from these arms. St George's cross represents England. On the crest the bishop's mitre references the university's foundation as an Anglican teacher training college. | |
| | Chichester, granted at unknown date. Registered as a trademark 28 September 2021. Escutcheon: Crest: Motto: Docendo Discimus (By teaching, we learn) The book represents learning. The martlets and the colours refer to arms of the counties of East Sussex and West Sussex. | |
| | Creative Arts, granted 15 April 2024 Escutcheon: Argent a saltire Azure issuing in chief in base and in the flanks four Chrysanthemum glowers Gules. Crest: Upon a helm with a qreath Argent Azure and Gules a Chrysanthemum flower Azure charged with a bee volant Or. Supporters: Dexter a griffin Or beaked and armed Gules gorged by a wreath Argent Azure and Gules pendent therefrom two keys addorsed wards downwards bows interlaced Azure sinister a griffin Or beaked and armed Gules gorged by a wreath Argent Azure and Gules pendent therefrom a horseshoe reversed Azure. Motto: Audere (To dare); Badge: A saltire square couped Azure surmounted by a hexagon voided enclosing a bee volant Or. | |
| | Cumbria, granted 23 October 2007 Escutcheon: Crest: Supporters: Motto: Aspiremus efficiamus (Let us aspire and achieve); The shield bears three parnassus flowers, the county flower of Cumbria. Two bishops' mitres in front of crossed artists' brushes represent both the Christian values and the creative traditions of the university. The shield is edged with gold twisted rope, representing the weaving together of various institutions to form the university. The crest features the torch of knowledge being held aloft. This rises from a blue wave that represents the Cumbrian coast and the lakes of the Lake District. The gold stars on the blue wave are inspired by the ceiling of Carlisle Cathedral. The crest is completed by two branches of Beech, derived the university logo. The supporters are a gold ram and stag, representing the animals of Cumbria. Around their necks are twisted ropes from which red roses, symbols of Lancashire. | |
| | Edge Hill, granted 24 January 2007 Escutcheon: Per bend Purpure and Vert on a Bend between two Suns in Splendour Or three Roses Gules barbed and seeded proper Crest: Upon a Helm with a Wreath Or, Purpure and Vert a Cormorant Gules beaked Or holding with the dexter foot a Quill palewise Or Mantled Party Purpure and Vert doubled Or; Supporters: On the dexter a Lion Purpure armed Or holding in the sinister forepaw a Peacock's tail-Feather in bend proper and on the sinister a Stag Vert attired and ungled Or holding in the dexter forehoof a Peacock's tail-Feather in bend sinister proper Motto: In Scientia Opportunitas (In knowledge there is opportunity) The university's origins are represented by the three red roses of Lancashire in the shield and by the Liver bird in the crest, which refers to its original location in Liverpool. The liver bird holds a quill as a symbol of learning. The sun represents enlightenment. The colours heliotrope, gold and green found in the shield were used historically by the women's suffrage movement and reflect a commitment to equality and the university's founding as a female teacher training college. | |
| | Falmouth, granted 15 October 2014 Escutcheon: Crest: Motto: Creative, connected, courageous The arms depict a Falmouth packet ship demonstrating Falmouth's connection to the rest of the world. Atop the coat of arms is a crest which depicts a Cornish chough holding a paintbrush, pen and pencil signifying that Falmouth University is truly a specialist institution of the arts. Just below this is a reference to Pendennis Castle. | |
| | Gloucestershire, granted 17 May 2002 Escutcheon: Argent three Chevronels interlaced Gules on a Chief Azure a Cross patée Argent between two Open Books proper bound Or; Crest: Upon a Helm with a Wreath Argent Gules and Azure, Issuant from an Ancient Crown Or a demi Griffin Gules winged Azure brandishing in the sinister foreclaw a Horseshoe Or. Mantled Gules and Azure Doubled Argent. Supporters: On either side a Stag the dexter Azure, the sinister Gules each attired and unguled Or and standing upon a grassy compartment charged with a Chevron reversed wavy argent charged with another Azure. Motto: In animo et veritate (In spirit and truth) Within the chief, which is identical to that of the borough of Cheltenham, the books refer to learning and the cross to Edward the Confessor who once owned property in the area. The chevronels refer to the de Clare family, who were the ancient Earls of Gloucester. The horseshoe in the crest reference the arms of the county of Gloucestershire. The two wavy lines in the base represent the rivers Wye and Severn. The stags used as supporters represent the Forest of Dean. | |
| | Greater Manchester, granted 5 March 1990 to predecessor Bolton Institute of Higher Education Escutcheon: Or Fretty Gules overall three Moorcocks two and one Sable a Bordure Gules charged with eight Pomegranates Or seeded Gules; Crest: upon a Helm with a Wreath Or Gules An Elephant statant proper its trappings Or charged on either side (one being manifest) with a Rose Gules barbed and seeded proper plain gorged and attached by a chain to the trunk of a Hazel Nut Tree Or Fructed Gules Mantled Gules Doubled Or; Motto Sapientia Superat Moras (Wisdom overcomes difficulty) In the full arms, the crest features the red rose, the symbol of Lancashire, placed on an elephant, taken from the arms of Bolton. | |
| | Harper Adams, adopted from arms of the university's founder with new grant 2 May 2018 Escutcheon: Azure three Cats-a-Mountain passant guardant in pale Ermine two Flaunches Or gutty Azure; Crest: Upon a Helm with a Wreath Argent and Azure A Greyhound's Head erased per fess Azure and Ermine gorged with a Collar embattled counter-embattled Or all within a Chain in arch also Or; Motto: Utile Dulci (Useful and agreeable) The arms were those of brothers Joseph Harrison Adams and Thomas Harper Adams, the latter being the founder of Harper Adams Agricultural College. | |
| | Hartpury, granted 25 November 2019 Escutcheon: Argent on a Chevron engrailed Sable between three Acorns slipped and leaved Gules a closed Book encircled by a Wreath of Olive Leaves Or; Crest: With a wreath Argent Gules and Sable A Boar sejant erect Sable holding with the forehooves an Acorn slipped and leaved Gules; Supporters On either side a Horse Sable gorged with a wreath of Barley Or; Motto: Consociari Gaudemus (Proud to belong) The acorns symbolise growth and development. The book represents learning and the olive wreath sporting aspiration. The wreath is also a feature of the arms of the Canning family, former owners of Hartpury House. The boar found on the crest links to those native to nearby Forest of Dean. The supporters are horses wearing barley wreaths symbolising equine and agricultural education. | |
| | Highlands and Islands, granted 9 May 2012 Escutcheon: Purpure, a compass rose Argent and Sable, in chief a fleur-de-lys Or between two open books Proper binding and fore-edges Or, a bordure Argent charged of thirteen hazel leaves Vert The books represent learning, a compass with fleur-de-lys at north represents the university's location. The 13 hazel leaves, indicating wisdom in Celtic tradition, represent the 13 constituent academic institutions. | |
| | Imperial, granted 6 June 1908, when a college of the University of London Escutcheon: Per fesse in chief the Royal Arms of the United Kingdom of Great Britain and Ireland, in base or, an open book proper inscribed with the word "Scientia". Motto: Scientia Imperii Decus et Tutamen (Scientific knowledge, the crowning glory and the safeguard of the empire) The university describes the arms as follows: 'the College arms are simple, confined to a shield, and display the Royal Arms together with a book representing knowledge'. Note: The college became independent from the University of London in 2007. | |
| | Law, granted 5 September 1967 to predecessor the College of Law Escutcheon: Ermine, on a cross gules a sword sheathed, point upwards, surmounted by an open book proper bound clasped and edged Or; on a chief gules, on a pale ermine between a pair of scales and a portcullis. chained, a Saxon crown Or; Crest: On a wreath argent and gules, An owl, wings expanded, supporting with the dexter claw a posy of mignonette, stock and lavender, proper Motto: Leges Juraque Cognoscamus (Let us know the laws and rights) | |
| | Liverpool Hope, granted 29 April 2010 Escutcheon: Gules a Cross engrailed of one point on each limb Argent surmounted by an open Book proper bound Azure and in the first quarter a mullet radiated Argent. Crest: (upon a Helm with a Wreath Argent and Gules): Upon the Capital of an Ionic Column a Lamb passant Argent supporting with its dexter forefoot over the shoulder a Staff Or entwined with Sprigs of Laurel and Olive alternately both proper and terminating in an Escallop Or. Supporters: Two cormorants proper Motto: ὲν πιστει ὲλπιδι και ἀγἀπη (Hope to all who need it) | |
| | London, Arts, granted 25 March 1998 to predecessor the London Institute Escutcheon: Barry of five Gules and Argent, a fesse wavy Argent charged with a barrulet wavy Azure; Crest: Upon a Wreath of the Colours, a terrestrial Globe proper ensigned with an ancient Crown Or and supported by an open Book proper Supporters: Motto: Primus inter artifices (First among artists) The five bars (red and silver) represent the five founding members of the London Institute viz. St Martin's School of Art, the London College of Fashion, Camberwell College of Art, Chelsea College of Art and Design and the London College of Printing. The blue and silver wavy stripe represents the River Thames as a unifying element of these London colleges brought together to form the university. | |
| | London Metropolitan, originally granted on 26 November 1971 to the City of London Polytechnic (later London Guildhall University), which merged with North London in 2002 Escutcheon: Argent on a Chevron Sable cotised Gules between three Mullets each of six points Azure three Fountains proper and on a Chief Vert a Dragon passant Argent the under wing charged throughout with a Cross Gules. Crest: On a wreath Argent Gules Azure Argent Gules and Vert a Cubit Arm vested Azure semy of Mullets and cuffed Argent pendent therefrom Cords and Tassels Argent and Gules the hand holding a Fish head to the sinister proper. Mantled Gules and Vert and Gules and Azure doubled Argent. Motto: Knowledge in abundance | |
| | Northampton, granted 8 December 1993 to predecessor institution Nene College Escutcheon: Vert a Bar wavy Azure fimbriated Argent surmounted by a triple-turreted Tower also Argent the portcullis raised Gold on a Chief Or two Open Books proper bound Gules; Crest: Crest upon a Helm with a Wreath Or and Vert Within a Circlet of Amulets embattled on the outer edge Or a demi Roebuck Gules attired and unguled Sable holding between the legs a Rose Argent charged with another Gules barbed and seeded proper Mantled Vert doubled Or; Supporters: On the dexter a Lion guardant Or and on the sinister a Bull guardant Sable gorged with a Collar attached thereto a Chain reflexed over the back Or each resting the interior hind leg on a triple-turreted Tower Argent the portcullis raised Gold all upon a Compartment of Water consisting of three Barrulets wavy conjoined Azure Argent and Azure; Motto: Ne Nesciamus (Let us not be ignorant) The arms feature a symbol of the (demolished) Northampton castle, referencing the town's arms. Two open books in the chief symbolise learning. The River Nene is represented by a wavy blue line both on the shield and the base. The dexter supporter is a lion rampant representing the town. The sinister supporter is a bull with a gold chain representing the county of Northamptonshire. Both supporters have footstools of the aforementioned castle. The crest is a roebuck which is from the arms of the Worshipful Company of Leathersellers with whom the university has a long association. The cogwheels in the crest represent technical education. The Tudor rose held by the roebuck also represents Northamptonshire. | |
| | Plymouth Marjon, granted 18 September 1925 to predecessor the College of St Mark and St John Escutcheon: Argent, two swords in saltire, points upwards, between four fusils gules; on a chief per pale azure and of the second, to the dexter a winged lion sejant guardant Or resting the dexter fore paw on an open book proper, and to the sinister a Paschal Lamb also proper Motto: Abeunt Studia In Mores (Out of studies comes character) | |
| | Queen Margaret, granted 24 January 2001 Escutcheon: Azure, an ancient crown Argent, on a chief of the Last a book expanded Proper binding and fore-edges Vert between a cross flory cantoned between four martlets Or and a castle triple-towered and embattled Sable, masoned of the Second and capped with three fans Gules, windows and portcullis shut of the Last. The crown is a symbol of Queen Margaret. On the chief there is a castle representing Edinburgh, a book representing knowledge and a cross with four martlets. The latter symbolise learning and the former the canonisation of (Saint) Margaret. | |
| | Richmond, adopted at unknown date Escutcheon: Crest: Motto: Unity in Diversity The sun represents enlightenment and learning. The book is a reference also to the latter. The stags heads refer to Richmond Park. | |
| | Royal Agricultural, granted 20 September 1956 to predecessor the Royal Agricultural College Escutcheon: Per fess dancetty azure and sable a garb Or in dexter chief an estoile representing the star Sirius argent Crest: Out of a coronet composed of six garbs set upon a rim Or, a ram's head sable, armed gold Supporters: On either side a Ram sable, armed and collared with a coronet composed of six garbs set upon a rim Or; Motto: Arvorum Cultus Pecorumque (Caring for the fields and the beasts) - Virgil's Georgics Book 4 line 559 The wheatsheaf (garb) is a symbol of agriculture. Sirius has a significance to agriculture in that the heliacal rising of the star, known to ancient Egyptians as Sopdet, preceded the annual flooding of the river Nile which was the foundation of their agricultural economy. | |
| | St Mary's, Twickenham, granted to St Mary's College of Higher Education 7 June 1999 Escutcheon: Azure a Cross flory between two pairs of Martlets respectant Or on a Chief engrailed Vert three Septfoils Argent; Crest: Upon a Helm with a Wreath Or and Azure A Unicorn sejant Argent winged Or armed and unguled and the tail tufted Azure supporting with the dexter forefoot a Pole thereon a Cresset Vert enflamed proper Mantled Gules doubled Argent; Motto: Monstra Te Esse Matrem (Show thyself to be a mother) | |
| | Solent, granted 2020 Escutcheon: Crest: Supporters: Motto: Ready for the future The university states "The shield depict[s] the Solent and Isle of Wight in a simple geometric design to highlight the University's origins and location. The crest pictures two Northern Gannets fencing, which reflects the University's longstanding connection to maritime and the Solent. The supporters are adaptations of the 'Warsash Dragon', which represent the University's...maritime education." | |
| | South Wales, granted to predecessor University of Glamorgan in 1999. Escutcheon: Crest: Supporters: Motto: Success through endeavour The shield features a bridge representing Pontypridd and books representing learning with the words 'Cofia Ddysgu Byw' meaning 'Remember to Learn to Live'. The latter was the motto of predecessor institution Glamorgan College of Education at Barry. The green background symbolises the semi-rural location of the main campus. The crest dragon holds a computer memory card representing technology. The chevron in the dragon's wings link to the De Clare family former feudal lords of Glamorgan. The dexter supporter and also the crest dragon represents Wales. The sinister oriental dragon represents the university's openness to the world. The two supporters surmount symbols of the area's industrial heritage, a pickaxe and cogwheel. | |
| | Swansea, granted 6 May 1921 to predecessor University College, Swansea (Wales) Escutcheon: Vert, an anchor in bend dexter, a pickaxe in bend sinister and a hammer in pale, surmounted by an open book all proper; on a chief argent a dragon passant gules. Crest: Motto: Gweddw crefft heb ei dawn (Technical skill is bereft without culture) The hammer, pickaxe and anchor represent Swansea's industrial and maritime heritage, while the book represents academia. The dragon represents Wales | |
| | Wales Trinity Saint David, original grant 2010, amended 5 September 2012 Escutcheon: Sable on a Bend between two Oak Leaves bendwise Or three Cinquefoils Azure; Crest: Upon a Helm with a Wreath Or and Sable Issuant from a Celestial Crown Or a demi Dragon Gules holding a Mitre Azure garnished Or; Supporters: Dexter a Lion Gules holding in the sinister forepaw a Book bendwise Azure clasped and edged Or and sinister a Dragon Gules holding in the dexter foreclaws a Key ward upwards bendwise sinister Or The arms combine elements of those of the two founding institutions University of Wales, Lampeter and Trinity University College, Camarthen. The three (blue) cinquefoils are taken from the latter's arms. Aside from the cinquefoils the escutcheon uses the colours of the flag of Saint David. The two oak leaves represent growth and the two initial constituent bodies. The Welsh dragon and celestial crown are taken from Trinity's crest. The bishop's mitre symbolises the role of the Anglican church in the formation of both founding institutions. | |
| | Winchester granted 9 August 2008 Escutcheon: Checky Or and Gules on a Chief Sable an open Book proper bound and between two Lions passant guardant combatant Or; Crest: Upon a Helm with a Wreath Argent and Sable A Castle triple towered Argent each tower enfiling a Saxon Crown Gules Mantled Gules lined Or; Supporters: On either side a Boar Argent spined and unguled Or in the mouth a Rose Gules barbed seeded slipped and leaved Or; Motto: Wisdom ond lar (Wisdom and knowledge) The crest is a three towered castle taken from the arms of the city of Winchester. The chequered pattern of the shield is from the arms of King Alfred and reference the former name of the university. The chief has a book to represent learning and two lions also from the arms of the city of Winchester. The supporters are white Hampshire hogs holding in their mouths red roses. The hogs represent the county and roses also appear in the county arms and those of William of Wykeham. | |
| | Worcester, arms (escutcheon only) granted to Worcester College of Higher Education 18 July 1988. Transferred by Royal Licence to University of Worcester 26 June 2006. Crest and supporters granted by College of Arms 21 November 2006 Escutcheon: Crest: Supporters: Motto: Ad Inspirandum Aspiramus (Aspire to inspire) The escutcheon has blue waves as symbol of the River Severn. The chief has two Worcestershire pears and a wheatsheaf representing agriculture of the region. The crest depicts mythical Sabrina of the River Severn and also two bullrushes representing the university campus on both banks. The supporters, swans holding pomegranates, are symbols of the river as well as persistence and regeneration. | |
| | Wrexham granted to Glyndŵr University 16 February 2009 Escutcheon: Per fess indented and per pale Or and Gules four Lions passant guardant each supporting with the dexter forepaw a Book palewise and affronty all counterchanged. Crest: Upon a Helm with a Wreath Or and Gules Between a pair of Dragon's Wings the dexter Or the sinister Gules a Stack of four Books spines affronty bound alternately Gules and Or Mantled Gules Doubled Or. Supporters: On the dexter a Dragon reguardant per fess Gules and Or and on the sinister a lion reguardant per fess Or and Gules. Motto: Hyder trwy Addysg (Confidence through education) The similar arms of Owain Glyndŵr show 'rampant' lions. The university's arms however have 'passant' (walking) lions. These are also the arms of the ancient kingdom of Gwynedd, adopted too by Bangor University and found in the Royal Badge of Wales. The lions support books representing learning while the shield is divided 'indented' for heraldic difference. | |
| | York St John granted 12 August 1981 to predecessor the College of Ripon and York St John Escutcheon: Argent on a Saltire Vert two Keys in saltire wards upwards and outwards Or on a Chief per pale Gules and Azure a Bugle Horn stringed Or between two Roses Argent barbed and seeded proper Crest: Issuing from a Crown two Torches pilewise enflamed Or each grasped in the talons of and Eagle rising wings displayed Sable; Motto: Ut Vitam Habeant et Abundantius (They may have life and have it more abundantly) In the chief there are two white roses of York representing the county. The stringed bugle is a reference to the arms of the city of Ripon. The crossed keys, a symbol of access to education also reference the diocese of York. | |

== Arms of constituent institutions ==
=== Cambridge colleges ===
| Arms | College | Full Achievement |
|---|---|---|
| | Christ's, confirmed in 1575 Escutcheon: Quarterly, first and fourth, Azure three fieurs-de-lys, two and one, Or; second and third, Gules three lions passant guardant in pale Or; all within a bordure compony argent and azure. (These are the arms of Beaufort; they are used by both Christ's College and St John's College, both of which were founded by Lady Margaret Beaufort.) | |
| | Churchill Escutcheon: Quarterly: 1st and 4th, Sable a lion rampant Argent, on a canton of the second a cross Gules (Churchill); 2nd and 3rd, quarterly Argent and Gules a fret Or, over all on a bend Sable three Escallops of the first (Spencer); over all in the centre chief point (as an augmentation of honour) an escutcheon Argent charged with the cross of Saint George in the centre point an open book Argent. Motto: Forward | |
| | Clare, confirmed in 1684 Escutcheon: Or, three chevronels gules, impaling Or, a cross gules; all within a bordure sable guttee d'Or. | |
| | Clare Hall, granted 1984 Escutcheon: Chevronny Or and Gules on a chief Sable five goutties three and two Argent. | |
| | Corpus Christi, granted 23 December 1570 Escutcheon: Quarterly 1st & 4th Gules a pelican in her piety Argent vulning her breast Proper 2nd & 3rd Azure three lilies two and one Argent. | |
| | Darwin, granted 5 January 1966 Escutcheon: Argent, on a bend gules cottised vert between two mullets each within an annulet gules three escallops or (for Darwin) impaling Per fess dancetty azure and gules, a caduceus between in chief two roses Or (for Rayne); all within a bordure Or. Crest: On a wreath Or and azure, In front of a lion passant Or, murally crowned azure, holding in the dexter forepaw a key erect, wards outwards, Or three escallops argent | |
| | Downing, granted 13 April 1801 Escutcheon: Barry of eight argent and vert, a griffin segreant Or within a bordure azure charged with eight roses of the first, barbed and seeded proper. Motto: Quaerere verum | |
| | Emmanuel, granted 13 April 1801 Escutcheon: Argent, a lion rampant azure, armed and langued gules, holding in the dexter forepaw a laurel wreath proper, in the mouth a scroll [of the second] inscribed EMMANUEL in letters Or. | |
| | Fitzwilliam, granted 1966. Escutcheon: Lozengy argent and gules; a chief of the Arms of the University of Cambridge. | |
| | Girton, granted 14 February 1928. Escutcheon: Quarterly vert and argent, a cross fiory counterchanged between in the first and fourth quarters a roundel ermine and in the second and third quarters a crescent gules. | |
| | Gonville & Caius, granted 1575. Escutcheon: Argent, on a chevron between two chevronels indented sable three escallops Or, impaling Or, semee of flowers gentil, in chief a sengreen above two serpents erect and respecting one other all proper, the serpents' tails bound together and resting on a square stone of green marble in base, and between the serpents a closed book sable, edged gules clasped and garnished gold; all within a bordure compony argent and sable. Crest: On a wreath of the colours, A dove argent, beaked and membered gules, holding in the beak by the stalk a flower gentil stalked vert. | |
| | Homerton, granted 22 December 1954. Escutcheon: Argent, a leopard's face jessant-de-lys sable between three griffins' heads erased gules; on a bordure azure eight open books proper. Crest: On a wreath of the colours, A demi griffin holding between the claws a lozenge argent charged with a leopard's face jessant-de-lys as in the Arms. Motto: Respice Finem. | |
| | Hughes Hall, granted 1980. Escutcheon: Quarterly 1st and 3rd Gules an owl proper Or.; 5th Gules a torch Or; 2nd, 4th and 6th Ermine. | |
| | Jesus, granted 1575. Escutcheon: Argent, a fesse sable between three cocks' heads erased sable, crested and jelloped gules; all within a bordure of the last charged with eight ducal coronets Or. Crest: Out of a ducal coronet Or a cock sable, crested and jellopped gules. | |
| | King's, granted 1 January 1449. Escutcheon: Sable, three roses argent; a chief per pale azure and gules charged on the dexter side with a fleur de lis and on the sinister with a lion passant guardant, both Or. | |
| | Lucy Cavendish, granted 1973. Escutcheon: Per fess enarched azure and sable, in chief two bars wavy argent, over all issuant from the fess line a water lily also argent slipped and leaved vert, and in base a buck's head caboshed, between the attires a lozenge argent charged with an escallop sable. Crest: On a wreath argent and azure, within a circlet azure charged with a barrulet argent and over all four estoiles or, a nautilus proper. | |
| | Magdalene, assumed. Escutcheon: Quarterly per pale indented Or and azure, on a bend of the second between in sinister chief and dexter base an eagle displayed a fret between two martlets of the first. | |
| | Murray Edwards, granted 1971 Escutcheon: Sable a Dolphin palewise head downwards to the dexter in chief three Mullets fesswise a Bordure embattled Argent. | |
| | Newnham, granted 27 February 1923. Escutcheon: Argent, on a chevron azure between in chief two crosses bottonee fitchee sable and in base a mullet sable, a griffin's head erased Or between two mascles of the field. | |
| | Pembroke, recorded 1684. Escutcheon: Barry of ten argent and azure, an orle of five martlets gules dimidiated with paly vair and gules, on a chief Or a label of five points throughout azure. | |
| | Peterhouse, granted 1575. Escutcheon: Or, four pallets gules; on a bordure of the last eight open crowns of the first. | |
| | Queens', granted 1575. Escutcheon: Quarterly of six, first harry of eight argent and gules (for Hungary); second azure semee-de-lis Or a label of three points gules (for Anjou-Sicily); third Agent a cross potent between four crosses couped Or (for Jerusalem); fourth azure semee-de-lis Or a bordure gules (for Anjou); fifth azure crusily two barbels haurient and addorsed Or (for Barr); sixth Or on a bend gules three allerions displayed argent (for Lorraine); the whole within a bordure vert. Crest: In a coronet of gold an eagle rousant sable winged gold. | |
| | Robinson, granted 1985. Escutcheon: Azure in base two Bars wavy Argent over all a Pegasus rampant Or gorged with a Crown rayonny Gules | |
| | St Catharine's, recorded 1684. Escutcheon: Gules, a Catherine wheel Or. | |
| | St Edmund's Escutcheon: Arms of Henry Fitzalan-Howard, 15th Duke of Norfolk (quarterly of four: Howard, Brotherton, Warenne, FitzAlan) with a canton of St Edmund of Abingdon (Or, a cross fleury gules between four Cornish choughs proper) all within a bordure argent. | |
| | St John's, assumed. Escutcheon: Arms of Margaret Beaufort: Quarterly France Modern and England; a bordure compony argent and azure. | |
| | Selwyn, granted 3 December 1964. Escutcheon: Per pale gules and argent, a cross potent quadrate [per pale] argent and Or between four crosses paty, those to the dexter argent, those to the sinister Or, for the See of Lich field, impaling Argent, on a bend cotised sable three annulets Or, for Selwyn; all within a bordure sable. Crest: On a wreath Or and purpure, In front of a book erect, bound gules, edged, clasped and garnished Or, a representation of the pastoral staff of Bishop Selwyn. Motto: ΑΝΔΡΙΖΕΣΘΕ | |
| | Sidney Sussex, granted 1675. Escutcheon: Argent, a bend engrailed sable, impaling Or, a pheon azure. | Sidney arms |
| | Trinity, granted 1575. Escutcheon: Argent, a chevron between three roses gules, barbed and seeded proper; on a chief of the second a lion passant guardant between two closed books, all Or. | |
| | Trinity Hall, granted 1575. Escutcheon: Sable, a crescent within a bordure ermine. | |
| | Wolfson, granted 1973. Escutcheon: Ermine a chevron gules between in chief two lions passant guardant or, and in base a handbell proper | |

=== Durham colleges ===
| Arms | College | Full Achievement |
|---|---|---|
| | Collingwood Escutcheon: Argent a Chevron between three Stags' Heads erased Sable a Bordure Gules charged with eight Crosses of St Cuthbert of the field. Crest: On a Wreath Argent Gules and Sable issuant from the top of a Tower triple towered Or a Holly Tree fructed proper Mantled Sable doubled Argent. Motto: Aime le meilleur The arms are those of the Collingwood family, differenced by the addition of the border. | |
| | Grey, escutcheon granted 1960, crest and motto added 25 February 2004 Escutcheon: Gules a Scaling Ladder in bend Argent between two St Cuthbert's Crosses proper. Crest: Upon a Helm with a Wreath Argent and Gules A Phoenix Or enflamed proper charged on each wing with a Cross Formy quadrate Gules. Motto: Gradibus ascendimus | |
| | Hatfield, granted 31 May 1957 Escutcheon: Azure, a chevron Or between three lions rampant Argent, a bordure Ermine. Crest: Out of an ancient crown Or a panache of five ostrich feathers Ermine charged with a chevron Sable. Motto: Vel primus vel cum primis (From 1846 to 1954 the arms of Bishop Hatfield were used undifferenced and without a formal grant; in that year a formal grant was obtained, differenced from the arms of Bishop Hatfield by the addition of the ermine border.) | |
| | John Snow Escutcheon: Argent a Cross formy quadrate azure, a chief azure thereon a Yorkshire rose argent between two lions rampant Or. Motto: per scientiam et prudentiam quaere summam | |
| | Josephine Butler Escutcheon: Gules on a chevron Or charged with a Cross formy, with cotises invected, between in chief two lions Argent and in base an open book charged with two covered cups. Motto: Comme je trouve | |
| | Stephenson Escutcheon: Argent a chevron between two fleurs-de-lis in chief and a cross fleurettée in gules a chief gules theoreon three lions rampant argent. Motto: Me quondam mirabitur orbis | |
| | St Aidan's, granted 31 May 1957 Escutcheon: Per chevron Argent and Sable in chief two ancient Northumbrian Crosses Gules in base two Keys in saltire wards upwards of the first. Crest: Motto: Super fundamentis certis | |
| | St Chad's, granted 17 December 1951 Escutcheon: Vert a Cross potent quadrate Or in chief a Durham Mitre of the last between two Lions rampant Argent. Crest: On a wreath of the colours, two hands Proper grasping a plate, thereon a cross pattee quadrate Gules. Motto: Non vestra sed vos The cross is a "St Chad's cross", taken from the arms of the Diocese of Lichfield, where Chad was bishop (see also the arms of Birmingham Newman University). The mitre references both Chad being a bishop and, with the coronet around the base of the mitre, the civil power of the bishops of Durham that led to the foundation of Durham University. The lions are from the arms of the Bishop of Durham, and originally from the arms of Thomas Hatfield (see also the arms of Hatfield College). The crest has a priest's hands elevating a eucharistic host decorated with a red St Cuthbert's cross, denoting both the blood of Christ and the association with Durham. The motto is taken from 2 Corinthians 12:14. | |
| | St Cuthbert's, granted 31 May 1957 Escutcheon: Vert a representation of St Cuthbert's Cross proper a Bordure Argent. Crest: Motto: Gratia gratiam parit | |
| | St Hild & St Bede Escutcheon: Argent on a Chevron Purpure three Ammonites of the first in base a Cross paty quadrate Gules a Chief Azure thereon between two Lions rampant Or a pale of the last charged with a Cross patonce also Azure. Crest: Motto: Eadem mutata resurgo The ammonites here and in the earlier arms of St Hild's College refer to the legend of St Hild turning a plague of snakes to stone, thus forming "snake stones" or ammonites. | |
| | St John's, granted 31 May 1957 Escutcheon: Quarterly Argent and Azure in the first and fourth a Cross Formy Quadrate Gules in the second an Eagle wings elevated and inverted Or in the third a Lion rampant Crowned with an Ancient Crown of the last all within a Bordure quarterly of the second and Gold. Crest: Motto: Fides nostra victoria | |
| | St Mary's, granted 31 May 1957 Escutcheon: Argent a Cross Formy Quadrate Gules a Chief Azure thereon a Durham Mitre Or between two Lilies proper. Crest: Motto: Ancilla Domini | |
| | South Escutcheon: Purpure between an Owl Close Guardant and a Cross Formy Quadrate both Argent a pile inverted conjoined with an orle of the second charged with a Torch enflamed of the first. Motto: Libertas, aequalitas, civitas totius mundi | |
| | Trevelyan Escutcheon: Gules issuant from Water in base barry wavy of four Argent and Azure a Demi-Horse forcene Or in chief three Saint Cuthbert's crosses Argent. Crest: Motto: Vera fictis libentius | |
| | University, granted 29 May 1912 Escutcheon: Azure a Cross patonce Or between four Lions rampant Argent on a Chief of the last a Cross of St Cuthbert Sable between two Durham Mitres Gules. Motto: Non nobis solum | |
| | Ustinov, granted 10 February 1966 Escutcheon: Ermine a Cross formy quadrate Gules on a Chief indented Sable between three Lions rampant Argent two Lozenges Or. Crest: Motto: Diversitate Valemus | |
| | Van Mildert, granted 3 February 1966 Escutcheon: Gules two Scythe blades in saltire in chief the Cross of St Cuthbert Argent. Crest: On a Wreath of the Colours in front of a Castle of three Towers Sable a Silver Penannular Brooch proper the ends charged with Gilded Crosses of St Cuthbert. Motto: Sic vos non vobis | |

=== London and South East University Group academic divisions ===
| Arms | Academic division | Full Achievement |
|---|---|---|
| | University of Greenwich, granted 7 December 1990 to the university's predecessor institution Thames Polytechnic, to mark the centenary of the original foundation as Woolwich Polytechnic in 1890 Escutcheon: Barry wavy of six Argent and Azure upon a Pale Sable a Gun Barrel erect surmounted on the breach by a Lion's Face Or on a Chief Gules an Open Book proper bound Or between on the dexter a Cog Wheel and on the sinister a Capital of a Doric Column both Or; Crest: Statant within a Coronet the finials composed of Roses and Escallops reversed alternately Or an Owl Gules; Supporters: Dexter a Horse Argent in front of a Cedar Tree proper and sinister a Lion Or in front of an Oak Tree proper on a Compartment comprising a Grassy Mount proper Motto: Discere, Agere, Conficere (To learn, to do, to achieve) Many elements of the arms reference those of predecessor institutions. The blue wavy lines represent the Thames river. The cannon is a symbol of the Royal Arsenal where many students historically were employed. The cogwheel represents engineering and technical subjects. The capital of a doric column refers to the Hammersmith College of Art and Building whose Departments of Architecture, Landscape Architecture and Surveying merged with Woolwich Polytechnic in 1969. The book is a symbol of learning. The owl in the crest represents wisdom. The white horse supporter is that of the county of Kent referring to Dartford College. The lion supporter references the lion found on the arms of the former London County Council. | |
| | University of Kent, granted 1 June 1967 Escutcheon: Per chevron argent and gules, in chief three Cornish choughs proper, and in base a horse rampant argent Crest: On a wreath of the colours In front of a representation of the West Gate of the City of Canterbury proper issuant from water harry wavy of four argent and azure, two crosiers in saltire Or; Supporters: On either side a lion passant guardant dimidiated with the hull of an ancient ship Or; Motto: Cui servire regnare est (To serve is to reign) The white horse of Kent is taken from the arms of the County of Kent (and can also be seen on the Flag of Kent). The three Cornish choughs, originally belonging to the arms of Thomas Becket, were taken from the arms of the City of Canterbury. The Crest depicts the West Gate of Canterbury with a symbolic flow of water, presumably the Great Stour, below it. Two golden Bishops' Crosiers in the shape of a St Andrew's Cross are shown in front of it. The supporters – lions with the sterns of golden ships – are taken from the arms of the Cinque Ports. | |

=== London member institutions ===
| Arms | Member institution | Full Achievement |
|---|---|---|
| | Birkbeck, granted 31 December 1948 Escutcheon: Chequy Or and sable, on a pale argent a sword gules; a chief of the second, thereon an owl of the third between two antique lamps of the first inflamed proper. Crest: On a wreath of the colours, A demi lion reguardant Or resting the sinister paw on an anchor sable enfiled with an eastern crown gold. Motto: In Nocte Consilium (Advice comes over night) | |
| | Brunel, granted 12 June 1970 Escutcheon: Azure, a pair of dividers chevronwise proper, in base on a pile re versed Or a lozenge ermine; a chief enarched in the form of a bridge of masonry proper Crest: On a wreath of the colours, A swan, wings addorsed, proper, about the neck a. mural crown Or, resting the dexter foot on a cogwheel proper The masonry arch symbolises I. K. Brunel's bridges. The compasses and the cogwheel symbolise technology. The ermine lozenge is an allusion to the Arms of Lord Halsbury, the first Chancellor of the university. The crest with a swan symbolises Uxbridge. | |
| | Goldsmiths, granted 24 August 1921 Escutcheon: Argent, a cross gules, on an inescutcheon azure a leopard's face Or; on a chief of the third an open book of the field edged and clasped gold | |
| | King's, 21 March 1995 (date of Royal Warrant) Escutcheon: Or on a Pale Azure between two Lions rampant respectant Gules an Anchor Or ensigned by a Royal Crown proper, on a Chief Argent an Ancient Lamp proper inflamed Gold between two Blazing Hearths also proper. Crest: On a Helm with a Wreath Or and Azure Upon a Book proper rising from a Coronet Or the rim set with jewels two Azure (one manifest) four Vert (two manifest) and two Gules a demi Lion Gules holding a Rod of Aesculapius; Motto Sancte et Sapienter (With Holiness and Wisdom) From 1829 to 1989 the arms of George IV were used. The current arms came into use in 1989 as a consequence of the 1985 merger with Queen Elizabeth College and Chelsea College and the goal to reference the three insitutions. | |
| | LSE, granted July 1922 Escutcheon: Sable a Beaver passant Or on a chief of the Second two closed Books Purpure clasped leaved and decorated gold. Motto: Rerum cognoscere causas (Knowing the causes of things) | |
| | Queen Mary, granted 1996 (previous arms assumed 1989) Escutcheon: Crest: Supporters: Motto: Coniunctis viribis (With united powers) The arms contain elements of former constituent colleges Queen Mary College (with the triple crowns originally taken from a sponsor of the college the Drapers Company) and Westfield College | |
| | Royal Holloway, granted 1985 Escutcheon: Crest: Supporters: Motto Esse quam videri (To be, rather than to seem to be) The arms of the current institution with the legal name Royal Holloway and Bedford New College, incorporate elements of the former Royal Holloway College and Bedford College. The three crescents in the chief are taken from Thomas Holloway's own coat of arms. The black and gold colours and chequered pattern are taken from the Bedford College coat of arms. The ermine tails (feather-like symbols) are from the former Royal Holloway arms. Placed between two black lozenges in the crest, there is a lamp of learning found also in the Bedford arms. Traditionally, the lozenge is found on the arms of unmarried women (or widows). Here it is a reminder that the two colleges were founded for women. | |
| | Royal Veterinary, granted 30 August 2016 Escutcheon: Crest: Supporters: Motto Venienti Occurrite Morbo (Confront disease at onset) The imperial crown represents the royal patronage dating back to King George IV. The cat's head and ram's head represent the veterinarian's role in attending both domestic companion animals and livestock. | |
| | SOAS, granted by royal warrant 14 October 1917, exemplified 3 December 1918. Escutcheon: Argent a cross gules in the first quarter a sword in pale point upwards, of the last; on a chief also gules an open book proper between a lotus bud on the dexter and a lotus slipped and leaved on the sinister, both or. Crest: On a wreath of the colours, In front a rising sun proper a lion passant guardant Or resting the cdexter forepaw on a scroll also proper. Supporters: On the dexter side a camel, and on the sinister an elephant, both proper. Motto Knowledge is Power | |

=== Oxford colleges and halls ===
| Arms | College or hall | Full Achievement |
|---|---|---|
| | All Souls, confirmed in 1574 Escutcheon: Or a chevron between three cinquefoils Gules. | |
| | Balliol, confirmed in 1574 Escutcheon: Gules an orle Argent impaling Azure a lion rampant Argent ducally crowned Or. | |
| | Blackfriars Hall, confirmed in 1994 Escutcheon: Gyronny sable and argent, a cross flory counterchanged. | |
| | Brasenose, confirmed in 1574 Escutcheon: Tierced in pale: (1) Argent, a chevron sable between three roses gules seeded or, barbed vert (for Smyth); (2) or, an escutcheon of the arms of the See of Lincoln (gules, two lions of England in pale or, on a chief azure Our Lady crowned seated on a tombstone issuant from the chief, in her dexter arm the Infant Jesus, in her sinister arm a sceptre, all or) ensigned with a mitre proper; (3) quarterly, first and fourth argent, a chevron between three bugle-horns stringed sable; second and third argent, a chevron between three crosses crosslet sable (for Sutton). | |
| | Campion Hall Escutcheon: Argent on a cross sable a plate charged with a wolf's head erased of the second between in pale two billets of the field that in chief charged with a cinquefoil and that in base with a saltire gules and in fesse as many plates each charged with a campion flower leaved and slipped proper on a chief also of the second two branches of palm in saltire enfiled with a celestial crown or. | |
| | Christ Church, confirmed in 1574 Escutcheon: Sable, on a cross engrailed argent, a lion passant gules, between four leopards' faces azure, on a chief or, a rose gules barbed and seeded proper, between two Cornish choughs sable, beaked and membered gules. | |
| | Corpus Christi, confirmed in 1574 Escutcheon: Tierced per pale: (1) Azure, a pelican with wings endorsed vulning herself, or; (2) argent, thereon an escutcheon charged with the arms of the See of Winchester (i.e. gules, two keys addorsed in bend, the uppermost or, the other argent, a sword interposed between them in bend sinister of the third, pommel and hilt gold; the escutcheon ensigned with a mitre of the last); (3) sable, a chevron or between three owls argent, on a chief of the second as many roses gules, seeded of the second, barbed vert. | |
| | Exeter, confirmed in 1574 Escutcheon: Argent, two bendlets nebuly sable (arms of Stapledon) within a bordure of the last charged with eight pairs of keys, addorsed and interlaced in the rings, the wards upwards, or. Motto: Floreat Exon | |
| | Green Templeton, confirmed in 2008 Escutcheon: Or between two Flaunches Vert on each a Nautilus Shell the aperture outwards Or a Rod of Aesculapius Sable the Serpent Azure. | |
| | Harris Manchester, assumed Escutcheon: Gules two torches inflamed in saltire proper, on a chief argent, between two roses of the field barbed and seeded, an open book also proper. Motto: Veritas Libertas Pietas | |
| | Hertford, assumed (previously "Hart Hall") Escutcheon: Gules, a hart's head cabossed Argent, attired and between the attire a cross patty Or, fitched in the foot Motto: Sicut Cervus Anhelat Ad Fontes Aquarum ("As the hart pants for streams of waters", from Psalm 42) | |
| | Jesus, assumed Escutcheon: Vert, three stags trippant argent attired or. | |
| | Keble, assumed Escutcheon: Argent, a chevron engrailed gules, on a chief azure, three mullets pierced or. | |
| | Kellogg, matriculated April 1999 Escutcheon: Per pale indented argent and azure on the argent a chevron enhanced gules in base a book azure leaved argent on the azure an ear of wheat palewise or the whole within a bordure gules. | |
| | Lady Margaret Hall, assumed in 1928 Escutcheon: Or, on a chevron between in chief two talbots passant and in base a bell azure a portcullis of the field. Motto: Souvent Me Souviens | |
| | Linacre, matriculated in 1988 Escutcheon: Sable an open Book proper edged Or bound Gules the dexter page charged with the Greek Letter Alpha the sinister page charged with the Greek Letter Omega both Sable the whole between three Escallops Argent. Motto: No End To Learning | |
| | Lincoln, confirmed in 1574 Escutcheon: Tierced per pale, Barry of six argent and azure, in chief three lozenges gules, on the second bar of an argent a mullet pierced sable; Argent, thereon an escutcheon of Gules two lions passant guardant or, on a chief azure the Blessed Virgin Mary ducally crowned seated on a throne issuant from the chief, on her dexter arm the infant Jesus and holding in her sinister hand a sceptre, all gold: the escutcheon ensigned with a mitre azure garnished and stringed or; Vert, three stags statant two and one or. | |
| | Magdalen, confirmed in 1574 Escutcheon: Lozengy ermine and sable, on a chief of the second three lilies argent slipped and seeded or Motto: Floreat Magdalena | |
| | Mansfield Escutcheon: Gules an open book proper inscribed DEUS LOCUTUS EST NOBIS IN FILIO in letters sable bound argent edged and clasped or between three cross crosslets or. | |
| | Merton, confirmed in 1574 Escutcheon: Or, three chevronels party per pale, the first and third azure and gules, the second gules and azure. Motto: Qui Timet Deum Faciet Bona | |
| | New College, confirmed in 1574 Escutcheon: Argent, two chevronels sable between three roses gules barbed and seeded proper. Motto: Manners Makyth Man | |
| | Nuffield, confirmed in 1574 Escutcheon: Ermine on a fesse or between in chief two roses gules barbed and seeded proper and in base a balance of the second three pears sable. | |
| | Oriel, confirmed in 1574 Escutcheon: Gules, three lions passant guardant in pale or a bordure engrailed argent. | |
| | Pembroke, matriculated 14 February 1625 Escutcheon: Per pale azure and gules three Lions rampant, two and one, Argent, in a Cheife party per pale Argent and Or, in the first a Rose Gules, seeded or, barbed vert in second a Thistle of Scotland proper. | |
| | The Queen's, confirmed in 1574 Escutcheon: Argent, three eagles displayed gules, beaked and legged or, on the breast of the first, a mullet of six points of the last. | |
| | Regent's Park College granted 3 March 1958 Escutcheon: Argent, on a cross gules an open Bible proper irradiated Or, the pages inscribed with the words 'Dominus Jesus' in letters sable; on a chief wavy azure a fish or Motto Omnia probate quod bonum tenete (Examine all and what is good, keep) | |
| | Reuben College granted 2021 Escutcheon: Argent in pale two Annulets and in base two Ermine Spots in fess Azure all between two Flaunches Vert each charged with an Ermine Spot Or. | |
| | St Anne's, Escutcheon: Gules, on a chevron between in chief two lions heads erased argent, and in base a sword of the second pummelled and hilt or and enfiled with a wreath of laurel, three ravens, all proper. | |
| | St Antony's, matriculated in 1952 Escutcheon: Or on a chevron between three tau crosses gules as many pierced mullets of the field. Motto: Plus Est En Vous | |
| | St Catherine's Escutcheon: Sable a saltire ermine between four catherine wheels or. Motto: Nova et Vetera | |
| | St Cross Escutcheon: Argent a Cross Potent Purpure a Quarter counterchanged. Crest: Upon a Helm with a Wreath Argent and Purpure an Armillary Sphere upon a Stand Or thereon a Dove with wings elevated and displayed Argent holding in the beak a Sprig of Mulberry fructed and leaved proper mantled Purpure doubled Argent. Motto: Ad Quattuor Cardines Mundi | |
| | St Edmund Escutcheon: Or, a cross patonce Gules cantoned by four Cornish choughs Proper. | |
| | St Hilda's Escutcheon: Azure, on a fess or three estoiles Gules in chief two unicorns' heads erased, in base a coiled serpent Argent. Motto: Non Frustra Vixi (I lived not in vain) | |
| | St Hugh's Escutcheon: Azure, a saltire Ermine, between four fleurs-de-lys Or. | |
| | St John's Escutcheon: Gules, on a bordure Sable, eight estoiles Or, on a canton Ermine, a lion rampant of the second, in chief an annulet of the third. Crest: A stork Proper. | |
| | St Peter's Escutcheon: Per pale Vert and Argent, to the dexter two keys in saltire Or surmounted by a triple towered castle Argent masoned Sable and on the sinister a cross Gules surmounted by a mitre Or between four martlets Sable, the whole within a bordure Or. | |
| | Somerville Escutcheon: Argent, three mullets in chevron reversed Gules, between six crosses crosslet fitched Sable. Crest: A dexter hand Argent grasping a crescent Or. Motto: Donec Rursus Impleat Orbem (Until it should fill the world again) | |
| | Trinity Escutcheon: Per pale or and azure, on a chevron between three griffins' heads erased four fleurs-de-lys, all counter-changed. | |
| | University, confirmed in 1574 Escutcheon: Azure, a cross patonce between four [sometimes five] martlets or. | |
| | Wadham, assumed Escutcheon: Gules, a chevron between 3 roses argent barbed vert (Wadham); impaling Gules, a bend or between 2 escallops argent (Petre). | |
| | Wolfson Escutcheon: Per pale Gules and Or on a chevron between three roses two pears all counterchanged the roses barbed and seeded proper. Crest: On a wreath of the colours in front of a representation of an arch in Iffley Church two rods of Aesculapius in saltire proper surmounted by a torch or inflamed proper. Motto: Humani Nil Alienum | |
| | Worcester, assumed from Sir Thomas Cookes Escutcheon: Argent two chevronels Gules between six martlets Sable. Crest: A mural coronet Or therefore a dexter arm in armour Proper garnished of the last grasping a hilt Argent hilted and pommelled Or on the arm two chevronels Gules | |
| | Wycliffe Hall Escutcheon: Gules, an open book proper the pages inscribed with the Latin words "Via Veritas Vita" in letters sable on a chief azure three crosses crosslet argent and in base an estoile or. | |

=== Other constituent institutions ===
| Arms | College | Full Achievement |
|---|---|---|
| | County College, University of Lancaster, granted 30 September 1969 Escutcheon: Gules, on three piles, two from the chief and one from the base, Or three roses gules, barbed and seeded proper; over all a chevron azure, and on a chief azure a lion passant Or. Crest: On a wreath Or and gules, Issuant from an ancient crown azure a bezant between two oak leaves proper. Motto: Sint consilio nihil. (Nothing Without Counsel) | |
| | Fylde College, University of Lancaster, granted 1981 (originally the arms of Fylde Rural District Council, 1954–1974) Escutcheon: Vert the Sails of a Windmill saltirewise Or on a Chief indented of the last a Rose Gules barbed and seeded proper between two Fountains. Crest: Out of a Coronet of four Cinquefoils set on a Rim Argent a dexter Arm in Armour embowed proper the hand gauntleted also proper and pendant therefrom a Buglehorn Sable stringed and garnised Or. Motto: Gaudeat ager. | |
| | Hulme Hall, University of Manchester Escutcheon: Barry of eight, Or and Azure, on a canton Argent, a chaplet Gules proper. Crest: A lion's head coupled Gules on a cap of maintenance (Gules turned up Ermine) upon the helmet of a gentleman. Motto: Fide Sed Cui Vide (Trust, but Mind Whom); The arms used by Hulme Hall are those of William Hulme, who founded the Hulme Trust in 1691, which later provided significant financial aid to Hulme Hall. | |
| | London College of Music, University of West London, granted 23 December 1944 Escutcheon: Azure on a pale Argent between two harps Or stringed of the second a sword Gules. Crest: On a wreath of the colours five trumpets in pile Or enfiled with a riband Azure. Supporters: On either side a swan rousant Proper charged on the wing with a harp Azure. Motto: Persevere | |
| | New College, University of Edinburgh, granted 3 June 2021 Escutcheon: Argent a saltire per fess Purpure and Azure surmounted of a book expanded Or in chief a burning bush enflamed Proper in base situated on a rock Proper a triple-towered castle embattled Sable masoned Argent and topped with three flags Gules windows and portcullis shut of the last. Crest: The two towers of New College Edinburgh Proper; Supporters: Dexter: A gowned student wearing the official academic hood of the MA in Religious Studies. Sinister: A gowned student wearing the official academic hood of the Master of Divinity (MDiv). Motto: Quaerite et invenietis. (Seek and You Shall Find) Matthew 7:7. | |
| | St Anselm Hall, University of Manchester Escutcheon: Crest: Motto: Credo Ut Intelligam; A variation (with five drops of blood) of the attributed arms of St Anselm. The hall has formerly displayed these arms with a bishop's mitre placed above the shield. | |
| | St Leonard's College, University of St Andrews Escutcheon: Chevronny of six, sable and argent, two lions pulling at a rose gules barbed and seeded vert on each of the chevronate panels of the second, overall a representation of St Leonard habited proper, enhaloed or, his dexter hand raised in the act of benediction, his sinister hand manacled with a fetter; lock azure. Motto: Ad vitum (For life) | |
| | St Mary's College, University of St Andrews Escutcheon: Per pale Vert and Argent, a lily stalked and leaved and an open book proper, edges Gules, in chief, the dexter flanked by an otter passant and three mascles Or, and the sinister by a lymphad, sails furled, Sable, and three cinquefoils of the fourth. Motto: In principio erat verbum (In the beginning was the Word); The arms countain elements from those of co-founders James Beaton and John Hamilton. | |
| | St Salvator's Hall, University of St Andrews Escutcheon: Argent, a chevron gules, between three crosscrosslets fitchée sable, within a double tressure flory-counter-flory of the second. The arms used by the hall are those of James Kennedy founder of the now defunct St Salvator's College. | |
| | United College of St Salvator and St Leonard, University of St Andrews Escutcheon: Crest: Motto: First and fourth quaters are the arms of James Kennedy; second, Alexander Stewart; third, John Hepburn. | |
| | Sutton Bonington Campus, University of Nottingham, granted c.1902, carried forward in 1947 when the former Midland Agricultural College became a college under the University of Nottingham. Escutcheon: Argent a chevron Vert charged with a book Or and proper between two garbs Or, set between three cows Gules. Crest: Motto: Aras Seris Metis (Plough, Sow, Reap) | |
| | Southlands College, University of Roehampton, granted 12 February 1968 Escutcheon: Azure, on a chevron cotised between in chief two fleurs-de-lys and in base a lamp Or inflamed proper, three escallops gules. Crest: On a wreath of the colours, In front of a demi sun Or a pelican in her piety proper. Motto: Light, love, life | |
| | School of Pharmacy, University College London, granted March 1950 (as University of London School of Pharmacy) Escutcheon: Argent, on a bend azure between two mortars, in each a pestle proper, a rod of Aesculapius Or; on a chief of the second a Tudor rose radiated between two open books also proper, edge and clasped Or. Crest: On a wreath of the colours, In front of a foxglove leaved and flowered, two poppy boles stalked and leaved in saltire, all proper. Motto: Salutifer Orbi ("Bringing health to the world"); The blue chief, the Tudor rose and the books are from the arms of the University of London. The pestle and mortars and the rod of Aesculapius are symbols of pharmacy and medicine. | |
| | Woolton Hall, University of Manchester Escutcheon: Sable on a Bend engrailed between two Garbs Or a Rose Gules barbed and seeded proper between two Lions rampant of the field Crest: Suspended from and between the Antlers of a stag a Stirrup and Leather proper Supporters: On either side a Lion rampant Or gorged with a Riband Azure pendent therefrom by a Chain also Or an Escutcheon Azure charged with a Liver Bird Argent; Motto: Fortitudine Virtute Dabitur (By fortitude and courage it shall be given); The arms of Frederick Marquis, 1st Earl of Woolton, Chancellor of the University of Manchester in 1959 when Woolton Hall was established. The arms can be seen around the hall in stonework and stained glass, and are displayed without crest or supporters but with the coronet of an Earl above. | |

== Former universities ==
| Arms | University | Full Achievement |
|---|---|---|
| | Manchester (Victoria), granted 14 October 1871 as Owen's College, Manchester Escutcheon: Argent, a serpent nowed vert on a chief nebulée azure, a sun issuant or. Crest Between two branches of laurel a palm tree proper, suspended in front thereof by a riband azure, a shield argent, thereon a lion rampant gules and a chief of the last charged with three bendlets or. Motto Arduus ad Solem (Striving towards the Sun); Note: This university merged in 2004 with the University of Manchester Institute of Science and Technology (UMIST) to form a new institution the University of Manchester. | |
| | Queen's University of Ireland, granted 15 September 1851 Escutcheon: Argent a saltire Gules charged with a royal crown of England between an open ancient book in chief and the Irish harp in base all Proper. Note: This university dissolved in 1882. | |
| | Royal University of Ireland, granted 11 October 1881 Escutcheon: Per saltire Ermine and Ermines an open book Proper clasped and surmounted by the royal crown Or between four escutcheons two in pale and two in fess the escutcheons in pale representing respectively the provinces of Leinster and Munster viz. Leinster Vert an Irish harp Or stringed Argent and Munster Azure three antique crowns Or the escutcheons in fess representing respectively the provinces of Ulster and Connaught viz Ulster Or a cross Gules on an escutcheon Argent a dexter hand couped also Gules and Connaught per pale Argent and Azure on the dexter a dimidated eagle displayed Sable and on the sinister conjoined therewith at the shoulder a sinister arm embowed Proper sleeved of the first holding a sword erect also Proper. Note: This university dissolved in 1909. | |
| | Swansea Metropolitan University, granted 10 October 2008. Escutcheon: Vert on a Bend sinister Argent three Hazel Nuts Tenny involucred slipped and leaved Vert; Crest: upon a Helm with a Wreath Argent and Vert Perched upon a Hazel Branch proper leaved Vert an Owl affronty Or holding with the dexter claws a Chaplet of Oak fructed Vert Mantled Gules doubled Argent The hazel nut is associated with wisdom in Celtic folklore. There are three displayed on the shield representing three predecessor institutions the Swansea Municipal School of Art and Crafts, the Swansea Training College and Swansea Technical College. The owl of the crest also represents wisdom. The chaplet of oak leaves held by the owl represents aspiration and achievement. The green, white and red colours link to the flag of Wales. Note: this institution which gained university status in 2008 subsequently dissolved and became a constituent campus of the University of Wales Trinity Saint David on 1 August 2013. | |
| | University of Manchester Institute of Science and Technology, granted 1956 as the Manchester College of Technology. Escutcheon: Gules, three bendlets enhanced Or; on a chief azure an open book proper, edged and bound, between two bees volant or. Crest Out of a coronet composed of four roses gules, barbed and seeded proper, set upon a rim Or, a demi lion guardant or murally crowned of the first and supporting a torch erect sable fired proper. Motto Scientia et Labore (By Knowledge and Work); Note: This university dissolved in 2004. | |
| | Victoria Escutcheon: Party per pale Argent and Gules a rose counterchanged between in chief a terrestrial globe semée of bees volant and a golden fleece and in base a cormorant holding in the beak a branch of seaweed called laver all Proper. Motto: Olim Armis Nunc Studiis (Formerly by weapons, now by studies). Note: This federal university ceased to exist in 1904, with institutions in Leeds and Liverpool becoming independent and a new charter granted to the Victoria University of Manchester. | |

=== Universities formerly within the United Kingdom ===
| Arms | University | Full Achievement |
|---|---|---|
| | Dublin, granted 28 March 1862 by Sir John Bernard Burke, Ulster King of Arms Escutcheon: Quarterly Azure and Ermine in the first quarter a book open Proper bound Gules clasped Or and in the fourth quarter a castle of two towers Argent flammant Proper over all in the centre point the harp of Ireland ensigned with the royal crown. The university was established in 1592 by a charter issued by Queen Elizabeth I. It is the degree awarding body for Trinity College Dublin. The harp is a symbol of Ireland. The crown represents Queen Elizabeth I and the book/bible learning and the Christian faith. The castle is taken from the arms of the city of Dublin. | |
| | Ireland (National), granted 7 May 1912 by Nevile Wilkinson, Ulster King of Arms. Escutcheon: Vert a harp Or with seven strings Argent in chief a five-pointed star of the second charged with a trefoil of the field. Mottoes: Veritati (Latin, "By truth") and Fir Fer (Irish, "Truth of men") The constituent colleges (Dublin, Galway and Cork at foundation) of the federal National University of Ireland are since Irish independence located within the republic of Ireland. The harp is a symbol of Ireland. The star represents enlightenment and it is adorned by a shamrock another Irish symbol. The background colour is green linking to Ireland and the shamrock. | |

=== Former constituent institutions ===
| Arms | College | Full Achievement |
|---|---|---|
| | Armstrong College, Durham Escutcheon: Argent, a cross pattée, quadrat in the centre gules, on a chief of the last three towers of the first, all within a bordure compony of the second and or, on a canton the arms of Baron Armstrong. (The arms of Baron Armstrong: Gules, a tilting spear fessewise or, headed argent, between two dexter arms embowed in armour, couped at the shoulders fessewise proper, hands extended of the last.); Crest: A tower, thereon a beacon fired all proper Motto Mens agitat molem (Merged with the University of Durham College of Medicine 1937 to form King's College, Durham; became Newcastle University 1963.) | |
| | The College of the Venerable Bede, Durham granted 31 May 1957 Escutcheon: Argent, an ancient Northumbrian cross gules a chief azure thereon between two lions rampant or a pale gold charged with a cross patonce also azure. (Merged with St Hild's College 1975 to form the College of St Hild & St Bede, with a new coat of arms incorporating elements of both.) | |
| | Bedford College, London, granted 13 August 1913 Escutcheon: Argent, between two flaunches paly bendy Or and sable a cross patee throughout gules voided of the field surmounted by an open book of the second; on a chief of the third, an antique lamp gold enflamed proper. (Merged with Royal Holloway College, London 1985 to form Royal Holloway and Bedford New College (now Royal Holloway, University of London), with a new coat of arms incorporating elements of both.) | |
| | Bishop Cosin's Hall, Durham Escutcheon: Azure, a fret or. (Merged into University College, Durham 1864.) | |
| | Bull College, Cambridge Escutcheon: Temporary 'college' for US Army GIs, at the Bull Hotel, Cambridge. The shield, designed by Al Kohler, combined US and UK flags, the University of Cambridge arms, a bull's head and an American eagle bearing a shield. | |
| | Cavendish College, Cambridge Escutcheon: Sable, three stags' heads caboshed, a bordure argent Assumed without authority (per Fox-Davies). Similar to the arms of the Dukes of Devonshire (the Cavendish family), with the addition of the bordure argent (A public hostel of the University of Cambridge from 1873 to 1892) | |
| | Charing Cross Hospital Medical School, granted 4 September 1934 Escutcheon: Ermine a Maltese cross gules, thereon on a plate fimbriated Or between four fieurs de lys in cross of the last a rod of Aesculapius sable; on a chief gules between two bezants an open book argent, edged and clasps gold, inscribed with the words IN HOC SIGNO VINCES sable. In 1984, CXHMS merged with Westminster Hospital Medical School to form Charing Cross and Westminster Medical School (CXWMS). In 1997 CXWMS merged with Imperial College, London (whose medical department was at St Mary's Hospital Medical School), the National Heart and Lung Institute at the Royal Brompton Hospital, and the Royal Postgraduate Medical School to form Imperial College School of Medicine. | |
| | Cardinal College, Oxford Escutcheon: Azure, on a cross engrailed argent a lion passant gules between four leopards' faces of the field, in the first quarter a griffon passant supporting a column or, in the second quarter an open book argent leathered gules, garnished or, on a chief of the last a Cardinal's hat of the third, between a torteau charged with two crosses in saltire of the fourth and a key of the second encircled by a crown of the fourth, and a hurt charged with a lion rampant argent, collared of the fourth, and a saltire of the last. (Suppressed 1531 and refounded as Christ Church 1546, retaining some elements of the arms.) | |
| | Chelsea College, London (Merged into King's College London 1985.) The arms of Chelsea College, formerly Chelsea Polytechnic, are adopted from those of Chelsea landowner Charles Cadogan | |
| | City, University of London, granted 1 August 1966. New grant 30 March 2009; merged into City St George's in 2024 Escutcheon: Murrey, upon a mount a beacon fired Or; a chief of the Arms of the City of London; Crest: On a wreath of the colours, In front of a chaplet of laurel Or a dexter hand couped below the wrist proper, vested murrey, holding a torch enflamed Or. Motto: To serve mankind | |
| | Durham College, Oxford Escutcheon: Azure a Chevron Or between three Lions rampant Argent The arms of Thomas Hatfield, Bishop of Durham and endower of the college, were adopted by the college. Hatfield's arms were also subsequently used in the canton of Durham University and in the arms of Hatfield College, Durham. (Dissolved 1545; buildings incorporated into Trinity College 1555) | |
| | Heythrop College, University of London Motto: Nil Sine Fide (Nothing Without Faith) (Closed 2019) | |
| | King's Hall, Cambridge Escutcheon: Gules, three lions passant guardant in pale or within a bordure engrailed ermine Assumed without authority (per Fox-Davies). Merged with Michaelhouse in 1546 to form Trinity College | |
| | Michaelhouse, Cambridge Escutcheon: Azure, the figure of St Michael overcoming the serpent. Assumed without authority (per Fox-Davies). Merged with King's Hall in 1546 to form Trinity College | |
| | Neville's Cross College, Durham Escutcheon: Argent a cross patee quadrate gules on a canton of the second a saltire of the field. Motto: Ne viles (Do not wish anything base) (Now part of New College Durham.); The college originally used "a broad white cross on a dark background with intersecting letters NCC over" as their arms. These were changed to conform to the rules of heraldry in 1933 to be printed in the Durham University calendar. The arms in the canton are those of the House of Neville | |
| | Queen Elizabeth College, London Escutcheon: Argent, a cross gules between four blazing hearths proper. (Merged with King's College London 1985) | |
| | Queen Mary College, London Escutcheon: Azure upon three several clouds (the sun-beams issuing ) three ancient imperial, crowns tripled all proper on a chief gules an open book also proper embellished and clasped or and inscribed SOLI DEO HONOR ET GLORIA in letters sable between two mullets also or. (Merged with Westfield College, London 1989 to form Queen Mary and Westfield College, with a new coat of arms incorporating elements of both. Further merged with St Bartholomew's Hospital Medical College and the London Hospital Medical College 1995 to form Queen Mary, University of London with another new coat of arms.) | |
| | Royal Holloway College, London, granted 1 May 1944 Escutcheon: Ermine, on a cross gules another argent, over all in the fesse point an open book proper; on a chief of the second three crescents Or. Motto: Esse quam videri (To be, rather than to seem to be); Merged with Bedford College, London 1985 to form Royal Holloway and Bedford New College (now Royal Holloway, University of London), with a new coat of arms incorporating elements of both. | |
| | St Hild's College, Durham Escutcheon: (in 1964; illustrated left) Argent a cross patee quadrate gules on a canton vert an ammonite or. Escutcheon: (granted 10 June 1962; illustrated right) Purpure three Ammonites in bend between two Cotices in chief a lion rampant supporting a Bourdon and in base a cross formy quadrate Argent; Crest: (granted 10 June 1962) On a wreath of the colours a crozier head or. Motto: Supra Montem Posita (Placed Upon a Hill) (Merged with the College of the Venerable Bede 1975 to form the College of St Hild & St Bede, with a new coat of arms incorporating elements of both.) | |
| | St Stephen's House, Oxford Escutcheon: Per chevron Gules and Sable in chief two Cross crosslets and in base a Celestial Crown Or. (Was a permanent private hall of Oxford from 2003 to 2023. Continues as an Anglican theological college) | |
| | St Thomas's Hospital Medical School, granted 28 January 1949 Escutcheon: Argent, on a cross between in the first quarter a sword erect and in the fourth quarter a rod of Aesculapius gules, a torch Or inflamed proper; a chief azure, thereon a rose of the first, barbed and seeded proper, between two fleurs-de lys also of the first The school merged in 1982 with the medical school at Guy's Hospital to form the United Medical and Dental Schools of Guy's and St Thomas's Hospitals. There was a later merger in 1998 to form King's College London GKT School of Medical Education. | |
| | Ushaw College, Durham Escutcheon: Per pale dexter argent a cross gules on a canton azure a cross of St Cuthbert proper sinister impaling Allen argent three rabbits couchant in pale sable. Former Catholic seminary, now historic house; licensed hall of Durham University from 1968 until it closed as a seminary in 2011 | |
| | University of Durham College of Medicine Escutcheon: Argent, St Cuthbert's cross gules, a chief tierced in pale; (a) the arms of Bishop Hatfield; (b) Or, the rod of Eusclapius in pale proper; (c) Gules, a castle argent. (The arms of Bishop Hatfield: Azure, a chevron or, between three lions rampant argent.) (Merged with Armstrong College, Durham 1937 to form King's College, Durham; became Newcastle University 1963.) | |
| | Westfield College, London Escutcheon: Sable, a cross quadrate Or; on a chief of the last an open book proper bound gules between two mascles that on the dexter enclosing a sinister hand couped appaumee, that on the sinister a lion's paw erased, all of the first. Motto: Tolle Lege (Take up and read) (Quotation from St Augustine of Hippo) (Merged with Queen Mary College, London 1989 to form Queen Mary and Westfield College, with a new coat of arms incorporating elements of both. Further merged with St Bartholomew's Hospital Medical College and the London Hospital Medical College 1995 to form Queen Mary, University of London with another new coat of arms.) | |
| | Wye College, London, adopted from arms of founder John Kemp Escutcheon: Gules, three garbs within a bordure engrailed Or; Crest: Motto: Luce et labore (By enlightenment and work) | |

== Arms of Student Societies ==
| Arms | Society | Full Achievement |
|---|---|---|
| | Cambridge University Heraldic and Genealogical Society, granted 30 May 2007 (College of Arms, London) Escutcheon: Or a Cross Pean between four Lions' Faces Gules and conjoined to a Bordure Pean; Crest: Upon a Helm with a Wreath Or and Sable A demi-Lion guardant Or supporting with its sinister foot a Book fesswise Argent bound Gules clasped Or and holding in its dexter foot a Crane's Leg a la quise Gules feathered Or; Motto: Caeruleus Candidus Vincet (Light blue shall conquer) | |
| | The Diagnostic Society of Edinburgh, granted 1975 (Court of the Lord Lyon, Edinburgh) Escutcheon: Crest: Motto: | |
| | Glasgow University Union Escutcheon: Crest: Motto: | |
| | University of St Andrews Students' Association Escutcheon: Crest: Motto: Stat Scotia Stat Aula (As Scotland stands, so stands the hall) | |

== See also ==
- Armorial of schools in the United Kingdom
- Heraldry
- List of universities in the United Kingdom
- Universities in the United Kingdom
