= Arms of assumption =

Arms of assumption are personal heraldic achievements claimed as a spoil of war, specifically, the coat of arms of a person defeated in battle who surrenders them to the victor in exchange for his life, or, which are claimed by the victor upon the death of the defeated. According to one source, arms of assumption have been considered more honorable than arms received through matriculation, for the latter "descend alike to the cowardly and the brave". Arms of assumption, historically, have only been lawfully borne with the approval of the sovereign and, once granted, matriculate to the new owner's descendants in the manner of regularly acquired arms.

Arms of assumption are not to be confused with assumed arms, which are arms claimed by an individual without grant from an authority.
