= Assumed arms =

Arms adopted rather than granted in heraldry

Assumed arms, in heraldry, are arms which have simply been adopted by the armiger rather than granted by an authority.

In England, the founding of the College of Arms was accompanied by a prohibition on the use of assumed arms. In other countries with an heraldic authority, such as Canada, the use of assumed arms is not illegal, however, "is considered improper and such arms have no legitimacy". As of 1998, five of the seven universities in New Zealand were reported to have been using "legitimate" arms, though many Australian universities were using assumed arms.

== See also ==
- Arms of assumption
