= Malcolm Knox =

Malcolm Knox may refer to:

- Malcolm Knox (author), Australian journalist and author
- Thomas Malcolm Knox (1900–1980), British philosopher, principal of St Andrews University from 1953 to 1966
