= Sally Mapstone =

Principal and Vice-Chancellor of St Andrews University since 2016

Dame Sally Mapstone DBE FRSE
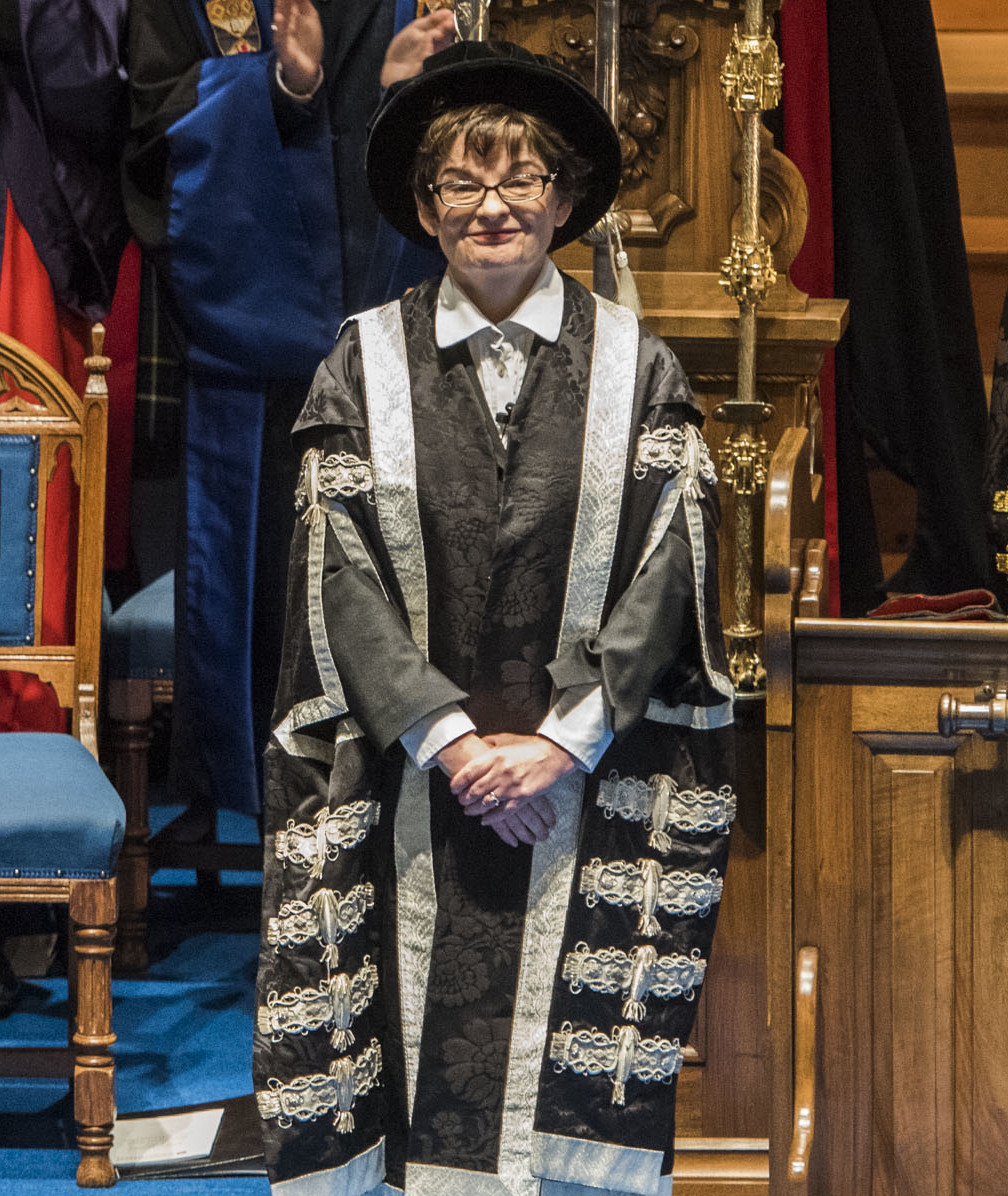

Principal and Vice Chancellor of the University of St Andrews
- Incumbent
- Assumed office 29 November 2016
- Chancellor: The Lord Campbell of Pittenweem
- Preceded by: Dame Louise Richardson

Personal details
- Born: May 1957 (age 69) Hillingdon, England, UK
- Spouse: Martin Griffiths
- Education: Wadham College, Oxford (BA); St Cross College, Oxford (MA, DPhil)

Academic background
- Thesis: The Advice to Princes Tradition in Scottish Literature, 1450–1500 (1986)

Dame Sally Mapstone DBE FRSE (born 1957) is a British academic who has been Principal and Vice-Chancellor of the University of St Andrews since 2016.

== Early life and education ==
Sally Mapstone was born in 1957 in Hillingdon, Middlesex, England, and grew up in West London. She read English language and literature at Wadham College, Oxford between 1975 and 1978, graduating with a first-class honours Bachelor of Arts (BA) degree.

After graduating from Wadham in 1978, she became an editor with Weidenfeld and Nicolson publishers in London, She was also Mother of the Chapel of the National Union of Journalists at Weidenfeld. She then returned to the University of Oxford to undertake a Doctor of Philosophy (DPhil) degree at St Cross College. Her doctoral thesis was titled 'The advice to princes tradition in Scottish literature, 1450-1500'. She was awarded her DPhil in 1986.

== Academic career ==
In 1984, Mapstone was appointed lecturer in Medieval English language and literature at Worcester College, Oxford, and Randall MacIver Junior Research Fellow at St Hilda's College, Oxford. At St Hilda's, she was lecturer in Medieval English language and literature, fellow and tutor in Medieval English language and literature, and Joanna Morse Memorial Fellow.

In 2006, she became reader in Older Scots literature at the university and was made professor of Older Scots literature in 2013. In the 2006-2007 academic year, she served as junior proctor of the university, and was appointed pro-vice-chancellor (personnel and equality) at Oxford in 2009. In 2011, she became pro-vice-chancellor (education) with responsibility for Oxford's strategy and policies for teaching, learning, student support, and admissions.

On 1 September 2016, Mapstone took up her position as the 11th Principal and Vice-Chancellor of the University of St Andrews, and was formally installed in post on 29 November 2016. In 2020, she accepted an invitation to extend her contract by five years to 2026.

=== Leadership ===
Mapstone was deputy chair of the University of Oxford Council and its General Purposes Committee, and served as a member and chair on a broad range of Oxford committees and boards. From 2011 to 2013, she chaired the group responsible for revising the university’s Strategic Plan 2013 to 2018.

She took a strong interest in diversity issues at Oxford, and launched the university’s mentoring scheme for senior women, Ad Feminam, in 2012. In 2016, she was the organiser of a major series of lectures by 'Women of Achievement'.

She also served as the only British representative on the steering group for the pro-vice rectors for teaching and learning of the League of European Research Universities (LERU), and was lead author on an advice paper, Online Learning at Research-Intensive Universities, published by LERU in 2014.

Mapstone has taken forward the university’s plans for the acquisition of the Madras College site, a former high school site on South Street in St Andrews, overseen a review of the university’s processes for promotion, launched a new university nursery, and sponsored and launched a new mentoring scheme for senior academic women, the Elizabeth Garrett Mentoring Programme. She also led the university through its response to the COVID-19 pandemic.

In June 2020, Mapstone discussed racism and the Black Lives Matter movement in a weekly update to students. She wrote: “You are all part of one of the world’s great universities and are amongst the best and brightest minds of our times. You have resources and choices, intellect and opportunity, and the levers of change are closer to your hands than they are for millions of others. For the most part, you can breathe.”

The comment “For the most part, you can breathe” was criticised by some students and praised by others in the wake of the murder of George Floyd. An open letter to the Principal in response to her comments, and addressing wider diversity concerns at the university, was signed by more than 2000 students.

On 12 June 2020, Mapstone offered a public apology on behalf of the university for its past failures in supporting BAME students and staff, the first Scottish Principal to do so.

On 21 November 2021, she wrote in an email to students about how she hoped that “trans rights will continue to be the subject of positive personal, academic and political discourse in society”. This was criticised by many students who said that trans rights should not be debated. A motion in the Students' Representative Council for the University of St Andrews' Students' Association has since been passed “to condemn the recent rise in transphobic incidents and extend support to our trans and non-binary community”.

In 2022, Mapstone worked with the student-led subcommittee Saints LGBT+ to record a video welcome for new students at St Andrews, in which she reaffirmed the university’s support for all LGBTQ+ students.

In the video, she says: “At St Andrews it is our goal to make the university a safe and supportive one in which you can become the very best version of yourself academically, but also personally. That means realising who you are, being empowered to make the choices that are right for yourself, and having the confidence to be who you wish. At St Andrews we will make every effort to support you from day one.”

=== University reputation and rankings ===
During Mapstone's tenure, the university attained a historic first place ranking in The Times and Sunday Times Good University Guide for 2022. This was the first time in the history of this and any other domestic league table that an institution other than the universities of Oxford and Cambridge has ranked first.

The University of St Andrews has also come first for student satisfaction with the academic experience in the National Student Survey for each year of her principalship. However, since 2016 the university ranking in both QS and Times Higher world ranking tables has deteriorated, falling in the Times Higher rankings from 86th in 2016 to 193rd in 2024.

Since taking office at St Andrews, Mapstone has led on developing a new strategic plan for 2018-2023, which launched in the autumn of 2018. The plan was refreshed and relaunched in November 2022 as the University Strategy 2022 to 2027.

=== Sector leadership ===
Mapstone also fulfils several leadership roles outside the University of St Andrews. She was elected Vice-Convener of Universities Scotland (US) in 2020 for a two-year term. She was then elected Convener for a two-year term that commenced in August 2022.

She currently serves as:

- Convener of Universities Scotland
- Chair of the advisory board of the Higher Education Policy Institute
- Chair of Universities Scotland’s Admissions Policy Group
- Vice-chair of the Carnegie Trust for the Universities of Scotland
- a member of the board of Universities UK (UUK)
- a trustee of UCAS
- a trustee of the Europaeum.

In August 2023, Dame Sally took over the Presidency of Universities UK (UUK).

== Research and professional interests ==
Mapstone's research is primarily on Older Scots literature of the 14th to 17th centuries (including literature in Latin) and on book history. A number of her publications concern the identification of previously unrecognised textual witnesses to Older Scots texts. She has also published on Chaucer and Malory, and on Shakespeare, as well as on later Scottish writers.

She is past president and honorary president of the Scottish Text Society. She is also a member of the advisory board of Studies in Scottish Literature, a member of the editorial board of Scottish Studies Review (to 2009), and an honorary fellow of the Project for the History of the Book in Scotland at the University of Edinburgh. She was elected a fellow of the English Association in 2013. As Principal of the university, she sits on the judging panel for the St Andrews Prize for the Environment.

In May 2017, she became the first UK university leader to be honoured by the Foreign Policy Association, which presented her with a medal to recognise her leadership in international higher education, and made her an honorary fellow. She also received a silver medal from the University of Helsinki, whose international advisory board she chaired from 2015 to 2021.

In 2017, she was made an emeritus fellow of St Hilda's College, Oxford, and an honorary fellow of Wadham College, Oxford, and St Cross College, Oxford. In June 2018, she was appointed the first woman president of the Saltire Society and, in February 2019, she was elected a fellow of the Royal Society of Edinburgh.

Mapstone was awarded an honorary degree by the University of Aberdeen in 2019 for her contribution to the field of Older Scots literature and for her record of leadership in higher education and widening access.

Mapstone was made a Dame Commander of the British Empire (DBE) in June 2022 for services to higher education.

=== Books ===
- Scots and their Books in the Middle Ages and the Renaissance (Oxford, 1996)
- The Long Fifteenth Century: Essays for Douglas Gray, co-ed. with Helen Cooper (Oxford, 1997)
- The Rose and the Thistle: Essays on the Culture of Late Medieval and Renaissance Scotland, co-ed. with Juliette Wood (East Linton, 1998)
- A Palace in the Wild: Vernacular Culture and Humanism in Late Medieval and Renaissance Scotland, co-ed., with L. A. J. R. Houwen and A. A. MacDonald, (Leuven, 2000)
- William Dunbar: 'The Nobill Poyet' (ed.) (East Linton, 2001)
- The European Sun, co-ed, with G. Caie, R. J. Lyall, and K. Simpson (East Linton, 2001)
- Older Scots Literature (ed.) (Edinburgh, 2005)
- The Edinburgh History of the Book in Scotland, Volume 1; Medieval to 1707, co-ed., with Alastair Mann (Edinburgh University Press, 2018)

Academic offices
Preceded by Louise Richardson	Principal of the University of St Andrews; September 2016–	Succeeded by Incumbent
