= Micheál Martin =

Taoiseach (2020–2022, 2025–present)

Micheál Martin TD
- Martin in 2026

Taoiseach
- Incumbent
- Assumed office 23 January 2025
- President: Michael D. Higgins; Catherine Connolly
- Tánaiste: Simon Harris
- Preceded by: Simon Harris
- In office 27 June 2020 – 17 December 2022
- President: Michael D. Higgins
- Tánaiste: Leo Varadkar
- Preceded by: Leo Varadkar
- Succeeded by: Leo Varadkar

Tánaiste
- In office 17 December 2022 – 23 January 2025
- Taoiseach: Leo Varadkar; Simon Harris
- Preceded by: Leo Varadkar
- Succeeded by: Simon Harris

Leader of Fianna Fáil
- Incumbent
- Assumed office 26 January 2011
- Deputy: Jack Chambers
- Preceded by: Brian Cowen

Leader of the Opposition
- In office 9 March 2011 – 27 June 2020
- Taoiseach: Enda Kenny; Leo Varadkar
- Preceded by: Enda Kenny
- Succeeded by: Mary Lou McDonald
Ministerial offices
Minister for Foreign Affairs
In office 17 December 2022 – 23 January 2025
Taoiseach	Leo Varadkar; Simon Harris
Preceded by	Simon Coveney
Succeeded by	Simon Harris
In office 7 May 2008 – 18 January 2011
Taoiseach	Brian Cowen
Preceded by	Dermot Ahern
Succeeded by	Brian Cowen (acting)
Minister for Defence
In office 17 December 2022 – 23 January 2025
Taoiseach	Leo Varadkar; Simon Harris
Preceded by	Simon Coveney
Succeeded by	Simon Harris
Minister for Agriculture, Food and the Marine
Acting; 21 August 2020 – 2 September 2020
Taoiseach	Himself
Preceded by	Dara Calleary
Succeeded by	Charlie McConalogue
Acting; 14 July 2020 – 15 July 2020
Taoiseach	Himself
Preceded by	Barry Cowen
Succeeded by	Dara Calleary
Minister for Enterprise, Trade and Employment
In office 29 September 2004 – 7 May 2008
Taoiseach	Bertie Ahern
Preceded by	Mary Harney
Succeeded by	Mary Coughlan
Minister for Health and Children
In office 27 January 2000 – 29 September 2004
Taoiseach	Bertie Ahern
Preceded by	Brian Cowen
Succeeded by	Mary Harney
Minister for Education and Science
In office 26 June 1997 – 27 January 2000
Taoiseach	Bertie Ahern
Preceded by	Niamh Bhreathnach
Succeeded by	Michael Woods

Lord Mayor of Cork
- In office 20 June 1992 – 21 June 1993
- Preceded by: Denis Cregan
- Succeeded by: John Murray

Teachta Dála
- Incumbent
- Assumed office 29 June 1989
- Constituency: Cork South-Central

Personal details
- Born: 16 August 1960 (age 66) Cork, Ireland
- Party: Fianna Fáil
- Spouse: Mary O'Shea (m. 1990)
- Children: 5, including Micheál
- Education: University College Cork
- Website: Constituency website

Micheál Martin (Irish: [ˈmʲiːçaːl̪ˠ]; born 16 August 1960) is an Irish Fianna Fáil politician serving as Taoiseach since January 2025, having previously held the position from 2020 to 2022. Martin served as Tánaiste, Minister for Foreign Affairs and Minister for Defence from December 2022 to January 2025. He has been leader of Fianna Fáil since January 2011 and a TD for Cork South-Central since 1989. He previously served as Leader of the Opposition from 2011 to 2020 and held various cabinet offices under Bertie Ahern and Brian Cowen.

Born in Cork, Martin initially worked as a teacher before entering politics. He was elected to Cork City Council in 1985, and served as Lord Mayor of Cork from 1992 to 1993. In 1989, he was first elected to Dáil Éireann for Cork South-Central, a seat he has represented ever since. After the victory of Fianna Fáil at the 1997 general election, Taoiseach Bertie Ahern appointed Martin to cabinet as Minister for Education and Science. In 2000, Martin was appointed Minister for Health and Children. In 2004, during his time as Health Minister, Martin introduced a ban on tobacco smoking in all Irish workplaces, making Ireland the first country in the world to introduce a full workplace smoking ban. In the same year, Martin established the Health Service Executive. He served as Minister for Enterprise, Trade and Employment from 2004 to 2008, before being appointed Minister for Foreign Affairs by Ahern's successor, Brian Cowen. In 2009, Martin became the first Irish foreign minister to travel to Latin America, during which time he also made the first official visit to Cuba by any Irish minister. Martin also visited Khartoum during his time as Foreign Minister, following the kidnapping of Sharon Commins and Hilda Kawuki.

In January 2011, Martin resigned as Foreign Minister in protest at Cowen's leadership. Following Cowen's own resignation as leader of Fianna Fáil, Martin was elected to replace him. Weeks later, at the 2011 general election, Martin led Fianna Fáil to the worst result in its 85-year history, with a loss of 57 seats and a popular vote of just 17.4%. He remained in the leadership, becoming Leader of the Opposition. At the 2016 general election, Fianna Fáil's performance improved significantly, more than doubling their representation in the Dáil: Martin continued to serve as Leader of the Opposition.

Martin led his party through the 2020 general election, at which Fianna Fáil became the largest party in the Dáil by just one seat. (Note: Sinn Féin and Fianna Fáil each had 37 TDs elected but as Ceann Comhairle Seán Ó Fearghail, a Fianna Fáil member, was automatically returned, this left Fianna Fáil as the largest party in the Dáil.) After lengthy negotiations, he was appointed Taoiseach on 27 June 2020, leading a coalition with longtime rival party Fine Gael, marking the first time these two parties had governed together, along with the Green Party. Under the terms of the coalition agreement, Martin served as Taoiseach for the first half of the five-year term, with his predecessor Leo Varadkar as Tánaiste. Martin resigned as Taoiseach on 17 December 2022 to facilitate the appointment of Varadkar to the office.

In the 2024 general election, Fianna Fáil achieved the most seats in the Dáil; Martin was appointed as Taoiseach in January 2025 after a new coalition government was formed.

== Early life ==
Martin was born on 16 August 1960 in Cork and was raised in the Turners Cross area. Martin was the son of Paddy Martin (1923–2012), a former soldier in the Defence Forces, CIÉ bus driver and Irish international boxer, and Eileen "Lana" Corbett (1929–2010). He was the third child in a family of five. Martin's eldest brother Seán and his twin brother Pádraig subsequently became involved in local politics in Cork. His two younger sisters, Eileen and Máiréad, have remained apolitical. Martin attended Coláiste Chríost Rí before studying arts at University College Cork.

It was during his time at university that Martin became involved in politics. He was a prominent member of the UCC Cumann of Ógra Fianna Fáil, the youth wing of the party, before serving as national chairman of Ógra. After graduating with a BA degree, Martin completed an MA in political history. Subsequently, he completed a higher diploma in education, and began a career as a history teacher in Presentation Brothers College.

In 2009, he published his MA thesis as a book: Freedom to Choose: Cork and Party Politics in Ireland 1918–1932.

== Early political career ==
Martin's time as a teacher was short-lived: he left after just one year to become a full-time politician, when he secured election to Cork Corporation as a Fianna Fáil candidate in 1985. It was from this local base that he decided to embark on a career in national politics a little under two years later. Martin was one of four candidates who secured the Fianna Fáil nomination to run in the Cork South-Central constituency at the 1987 general election; however, of the four he polled the fewest first-preference votes and failed to be elected. He became a member of the Fianna Fáil national executive in 1988.

In 1989, Taoiseach Charles Haughey called a snap election, and Martin was once again added to the Fianna Fáil ticket in Cork South-Central, and on that occasion he secured election to Dáil Éireann. He has been re-elected at each election since.

In his first few years as a TD, Martin served on a number of Oireachtas committees, including those dealing with crime, finance and the Irish language. He served as Lord Mayor of Cork in 1992. Two years later, in December 1994, Bertie Ahern was elected as the new leader of Fianna Fáil, as the party lost power and went into opposition. Martin, however, joined Ahern's new front bench at the start of 1995 as Spokesperson on Education and the Gaeltacht.

== Cabinet career (1997–2011) ==
=== Minister for Education and Science (1997–2000) ===
When Fianna Fáil returned to power following the 1997 general election, Martin was appointed to the newly expanded position of Minister for Education and Science. Aged 36, he was the youngest member of Bertie Ahern's first cabinet. As Minister for Education and Science, his tenure was characterised by an increase in spending at all levels of education, while a number of educational initiatives, such as a review of the primary school curriculum and the introduction of special needs assistants, were also initiated.

=== Minister for Health and Children (2000–2004) ===
In a cabinet reshuffle in January 2000, Martin was appointed Minister for Health and Children. Martin's predecessor, Brian Cowen, described the position as "like being in Angola", because 'landmines' can go off at any time.

Despite tough opposition, Martin introduced a ban on tobacco smoking in all Irish workplaces, including pubs and restaurants. On 30 January 2003 he announced his intention to have the ban in place on 1 January 2004. He visited New York in September 2003 to look at how a similar ban worked there, and signed the UN's framework convention on tobacco control at their headquarters. The smoking ban was introduced on 29 March 2004, making Ireland the first country in the world to introduce a blanket ban on smoking in the workplace. On 4 September 2004 Martin was presented with an award for his work on the smoking ban by the European Respiratory Society in Glasgow.

He introduced an overhaul of the health system, which included the abolition of the health boards and the establishment of the Health Service Executive (HSE). He deregulated the country's pharmacies on 31 January 2002.

In October 2003, Martin promised to examine cases of symphysiotomy in Irish hospitals which occurred during the 1940s and 1950s, and offered free health care to those affected.

=== Minister for Enterprise, Trade and Employment (2004–2008) ===
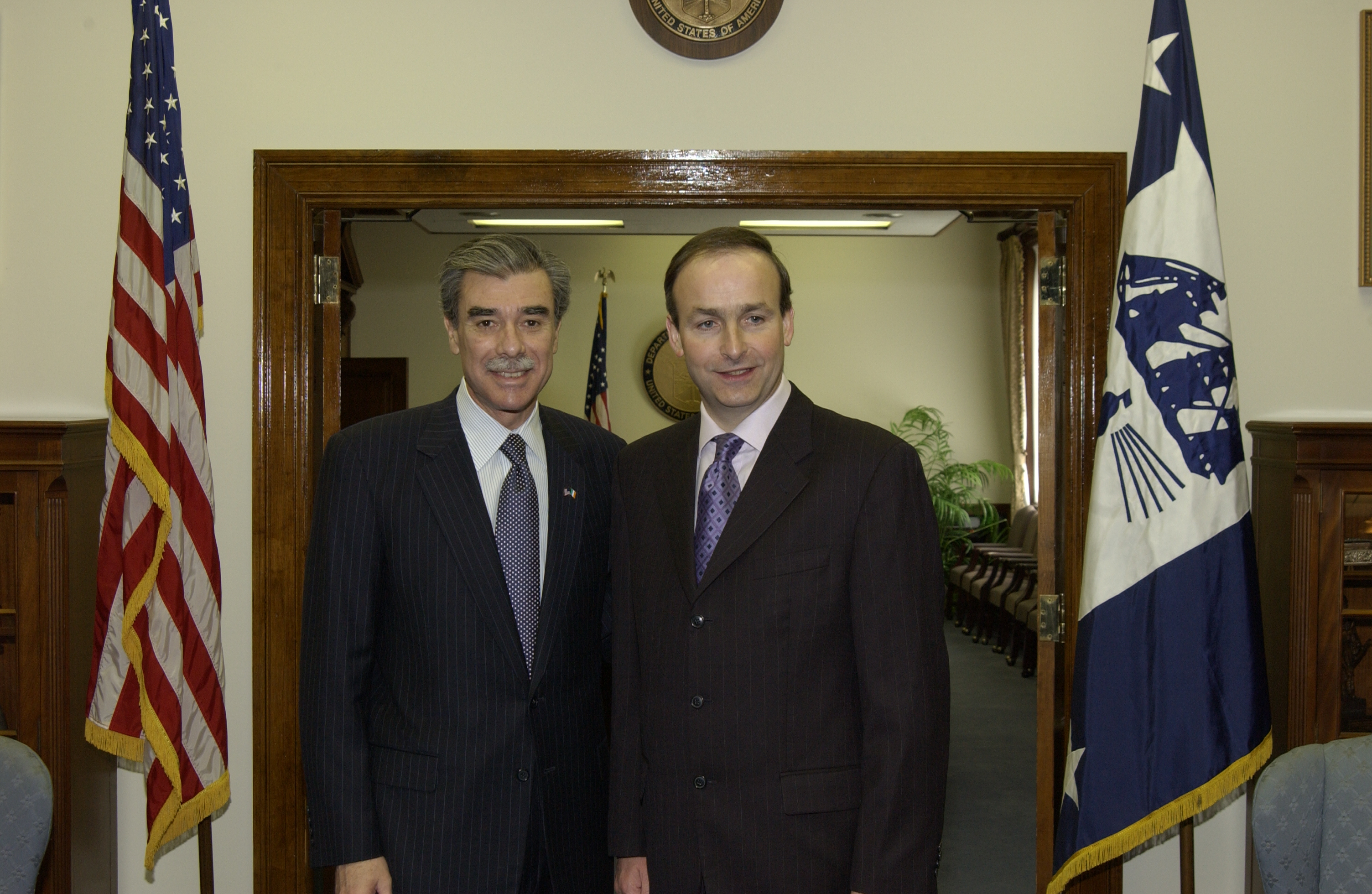
Martin with US Secretary of Commerce Carlos Gutierrez in April 2005

In September 2004, he exchanged government positions with Mary Harney, to become Minister for Enterprise, Trade and Employment. The following September, the government's economic record on the cost of living came under scrutiny from the RTÉ television programme Rip-Off Republic. This led to Martin abolishing the controversial Groceries Order 1987, a piece of legislation which prohibited the sale of groceries below cost price.

Letters containing death threats and shotgun cartridges, from a group calling itself the Irish Citizens Defence Force, were posted to Martin on 29 February 2008, at a prominent Dublin fertility clinic.

=== Minister for Foreign Affairs (2008–2011) ===
On the resignation of Bertie Ahern as Taoiseach in May 2008, Martin supported Brian Cowen's bid for the Fianna Fáil leadership.

In a cabinet reshuffle on 13 May 2008, following the election of Brian Cowen as Taoiseach, Martin became Minister for Foreign Affairs. One of the first issues that he had to deal with was the referendum on the Treaty of Lisbon.

Martin led the government campaign. Despite the overwhelming majority of government and opposition parties supporting a Yes vote, the electorate rejected the government's recommendation. Martin and Cowen failed to convince the Irish public to support the ratification of the Treaty of Lisbon, and this protest expressed in the referendum on 12 June 2008 plunged the government into a major political crisis.

In February 2009, Martin travelled to Latin America for the first time, making stopovers in Mexico and Havana; it was the first time an Irish government Minister had made an official visit to Cuba.

In September 2009, he travelled to Khartoum to discuss the kidnapping of Sharon Commins and Hilda Kawuki with the Sudanese government.

On 7 February 2010, he defended the €4.4 million redevelopment of the Irish embassy in Ottawa, Canada. While in Brussels on 22 February 2010, he questioned Foreign Affairs Minister of Israel Avigdor Lieberman over the use of fraudulent Irish passports in the assassination of Mahmoud al-Mabhouh.

On 17 March 2010, he met President of the United States Barack Obama in the White House, alongside Taoiseach Brian Cowen.

On 26 May 2010, he met with senior Chinese leaders in Beijing, to discuss relations between China and Ireland, before travelling onward to Shanghai. While there, he visited the Irish pavilion at Expo 2010 in the city.

On 28 June 2010, he began a five-day trip to Uganda and Ethiopia, where he visited buildings and met ministers and businesspeople.

==== Criticism of Gaza blockade ====
As Minister for Foreign Affairs, Martin was critical of the blockade of Gaza, particularly after being denied access to the area in 2009. He wrote to Spain (incoming holder of the presidency of the Council of the EU) to suggest that the EU send a delegation of foreign ministers to the area in 2010. He made his first visit there himself on 25 February 2010, on a one-day humanitarian mission through the Egyptian border. In doing so, Martin became the first Western foreign minister to visit Gaza since Hamas took control in 2007. While in Gaza, the Minister toured hospitals and schools. He was accompanied by United Nations vehicles.

I would appeal to the Israeli government and all concerned to lift this blockade. Micheál Martin appeals to Israel while in Gaza on 25 February 2010.

The following week Martin wrote about his experience in the International Herald Tribune.

Martin was Minister for Foreign Affairs during the 2010 Gaza flotilla raid and its aftermath. He told Dáil Éireann that he had requested that the Israeli government allow the MV Rachel Corrie to deliver its cargo of aid to Gaza instead of involving itself in "further bloodshed".

== Leadership of Fianna Fáil (2011–present) ==
=== 2011 ===
In September 2010, doubts about Brian Cowen's abilities and political judgment as Taoiseach and party leader emerged following a disastrous early-morning radio interview on Morning Ireland. Cowen survived; however, that same month Martin admitted that he and other cabinet members, namely Brian Lenihan and Dermot Ahern, harboured ambitions to lead the party should a vacancy arise. While some backbench rebel Fianna Fáil TDs and senators called for Cowen to go, no cabinet minister publicly came forward to challenge the incumbent. In spite of this, Martin once again expressed an interest in running for the leadership of Fianna Fáil once the vacancy arises in December 2010 on RTÉ's Saturday View radio programme.

On 16 January 2011, Martin announced that he would vote against Brian Cowen in the upcoming confidence motion in his leadership of the party. He offered to resign as Minister for Foreign Affairs, but his resignation was initially refused by Cowen. Following the result of the motion, which Cowen won, the resignation was accepted.

On 22 January 2011, just days after winning a vote of confidence, Brian Cowen announced that he was stepping down as leader of Fianna Fáil, but would remain as Taoiseach. On a special RTÉ News programme that day, a number of Fianna Fáil TDs and senators came on the air and publicly backed Martin for the leadership. Later that evening, Martin formally announced his intention to seek support for the leadership of Fianna Fáil. He was immediately seen as the front-runner; however, a number of other candidates, including Brian Lenihan Éamon Ó Cuív and Mary Hanafin, entered the field to ensure a contest.

On 26 January 2011, the Fianna Fáil parliamentary party met to elect a new leader. Martin was proposed by Dara Calleary and seconded by Áine Brady and received 33 first-preference votes. After Hanafin and Lenihan had been eliminated from the contest and their surplus votes distributed, Martin emerged with 50 votes and was duly elected the eighth leader of Fianna Fáil. After election, he pledged to reinvigorate Fianna Fáil from its traditional centre ground roots, believing that Fianna Fáil has never delivered to the Irish people through the labels of left and right.

Martin led the party into the 2011 general election, which saw Fianna Fáil swept from power in the worst defeat of a sitting government in the history of the Irish state. The party saw its first-preference vote more than halved. Without significant transfers, the count quickly turned into a rout. Ultimately, Fianna Fáil lost 57 seats, representing a decline of 75%–the worst electoral performance in its 85-year history. The party was knocked down to only 20 seats for third place–the first time in 79 years that it was not the largest party in the Dáil.

While Martin and other Fianna Fáil leaders concluded early on that they would not be re-elected to another term in government, they were surprised by the severity of the defeat; they had hoped to hold onto at least 30 seats. In the wake of what has been described as "defeat on a historic scale", Martin pledged to renew the party "at every level".

During the Seanad elections, Martin recommended support for 10 candidates, in an attempt to bring new blood into the parliamentary party. This caused resentment from Fianna Fáil Councillors and incumbent Fianna Fáil Senators. Only five of the recommended ten were elected, although the party performed better than expected winning fourteen seats.

In August 2011, Martin approached Gay Byrne as a possible nominee for the presidential election, but this approach caused controversy within his party, who favoured an internal candidate, Brian Crowley, which was exacerbated on the declining of the nomination by Byrne and the withdrawal from the process by Crowley. In an opinion poll in September 2011, Fianna Fáil's popularity fell to 10%, several points lower than its performance in the February 2011 election.

=== 2016–2018 ===
In 2016, he criticised Fine Gael for plans to cut personal taxation in Ireland to levels seen in the United States.

At the 2016 general election, Martin led Fianna Fáil to a modest recovery, with a representation of 44 seats in the 158-member parliament. In 2016, he was nominated for Taoiseach, but no nominees received enough votes to be nominated as Taoiseach.

Martin was also the party Spokesperson on Northern Ireland.

In January 2018, Martin stated that he would support a relaxation of Ireland's abortion stance, citing "cruel inflexibility and unintended consequences". Specifically, he said "he would vote in favour of repealing the Eighth Amendment and to allow abortion on request until near the end of the first trimester," leading to some political conflict within Fianna Fáil. 31 of the party's TDs and Senators posed for a photograph showing their opposition to repealing the eighth amendment, with over half of the parliamentary party supporting a No vote.

In November 2018, Varadkar and Martin argued over carbon tax increases led to the Dáil almost being adjourned for the day. Martin was given the decision in December 2018 on whether to enter into talks to renegotiate the confidence-and-supply deal. In December 2018, Martin ruled out a 2019 general election, agreeing to a one-year extension between his party and Fine Gael in Ireland's "national interest".

== Taoiseach (2020–2022) ==
=== 2020 ===
On 27 June 2020, Martin was elected as Taoiseach, in a historic coalition agreement that saw his party Fianna Fáil go into government with the Green Party and Fianna Fáil's historical rivals, Fine Gael. A majority of 93 members of the Dáil voted in favour of him taking the role, while 63 members voted against him. As part of the agreement, Varadkar became Tánaiste in Martin's government, and swapped roles with Martin in December 2022, approximately two-and-a-half years into the five-year parliamentary term.

In July 2020, following drunk-driving revelations, he sacked Barry Cowen as Minister for Agriculture, Food and the Marine. Cowen's successor Dara Calleary resigned that August following the Golfgate scandal, having attended a social hosted by the Oireachtas Golf Society which was contrary to national health guidelines surrounding the ongoing COVID-19 pandemic.

=== 2021 ===
In July 2021, Fianna Fáil suffered what many sources called the party's worst-ever electoral defeat when the party polled extremely poorly in the 2021 Dublin Bay South by-election. Subsequently, there was much unrest within Fianna Fáil, with a number of TDs such as Jim O'Callaghan, Cathal Crowe, James Lawless and Marc MacSharry openly questioning in public whether or not Martin should lead the party into the next general election.

=== 2022 ===
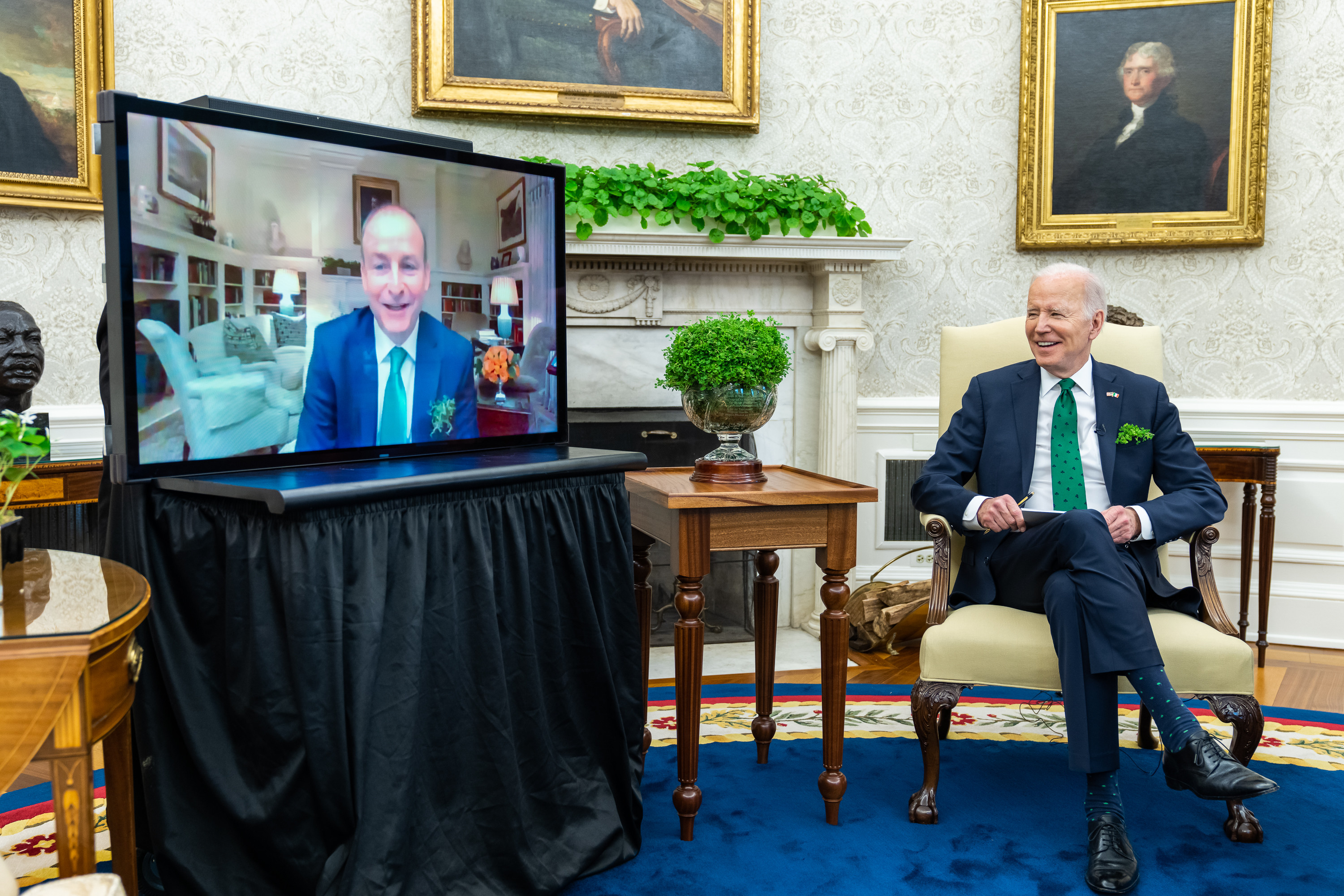
Martin with U.S. President Joe Biden virtually on St Patrick's Day in 2022

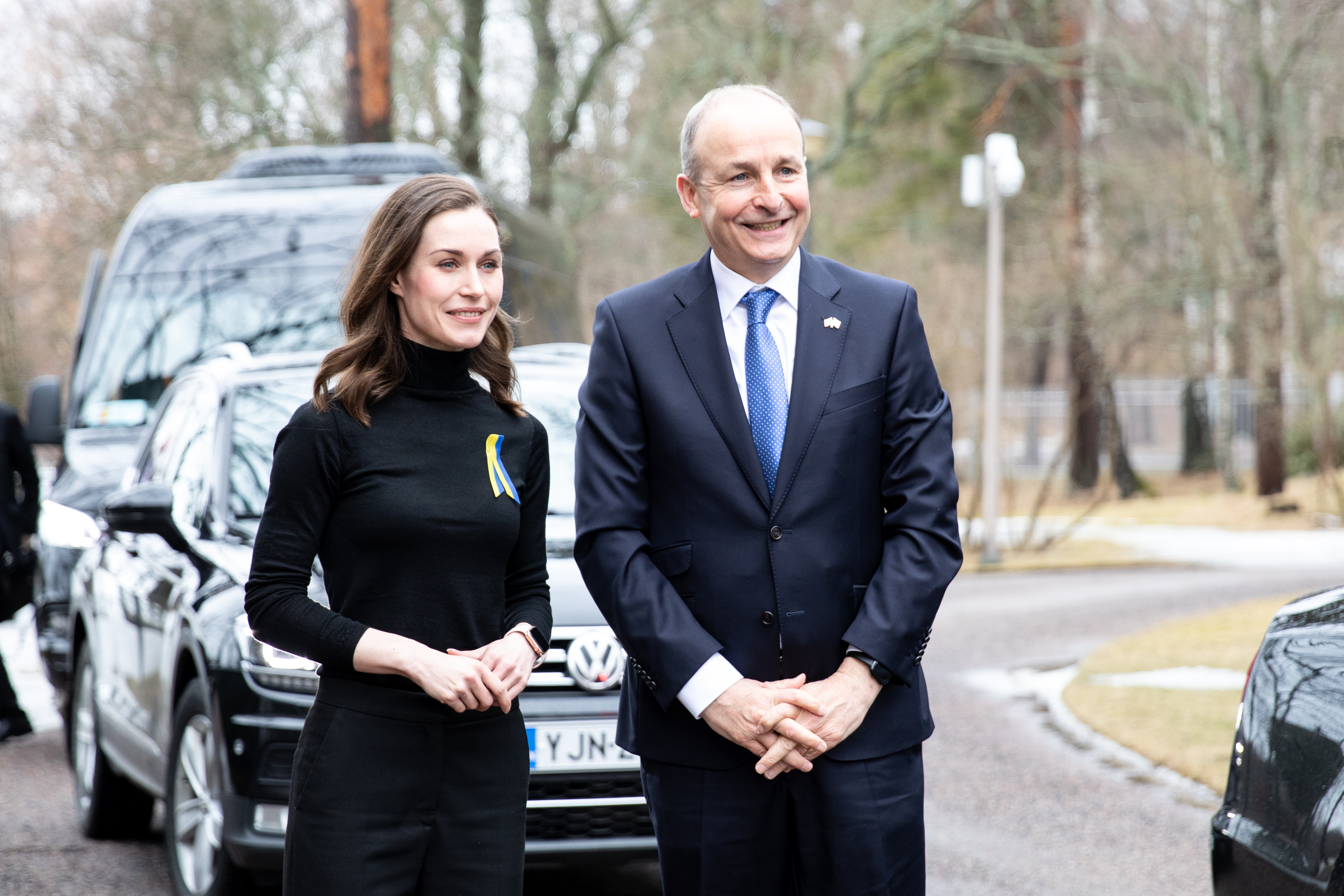
Martin with Finnish prime minister Sanna Marin in Helsinki, Finland in April 2022

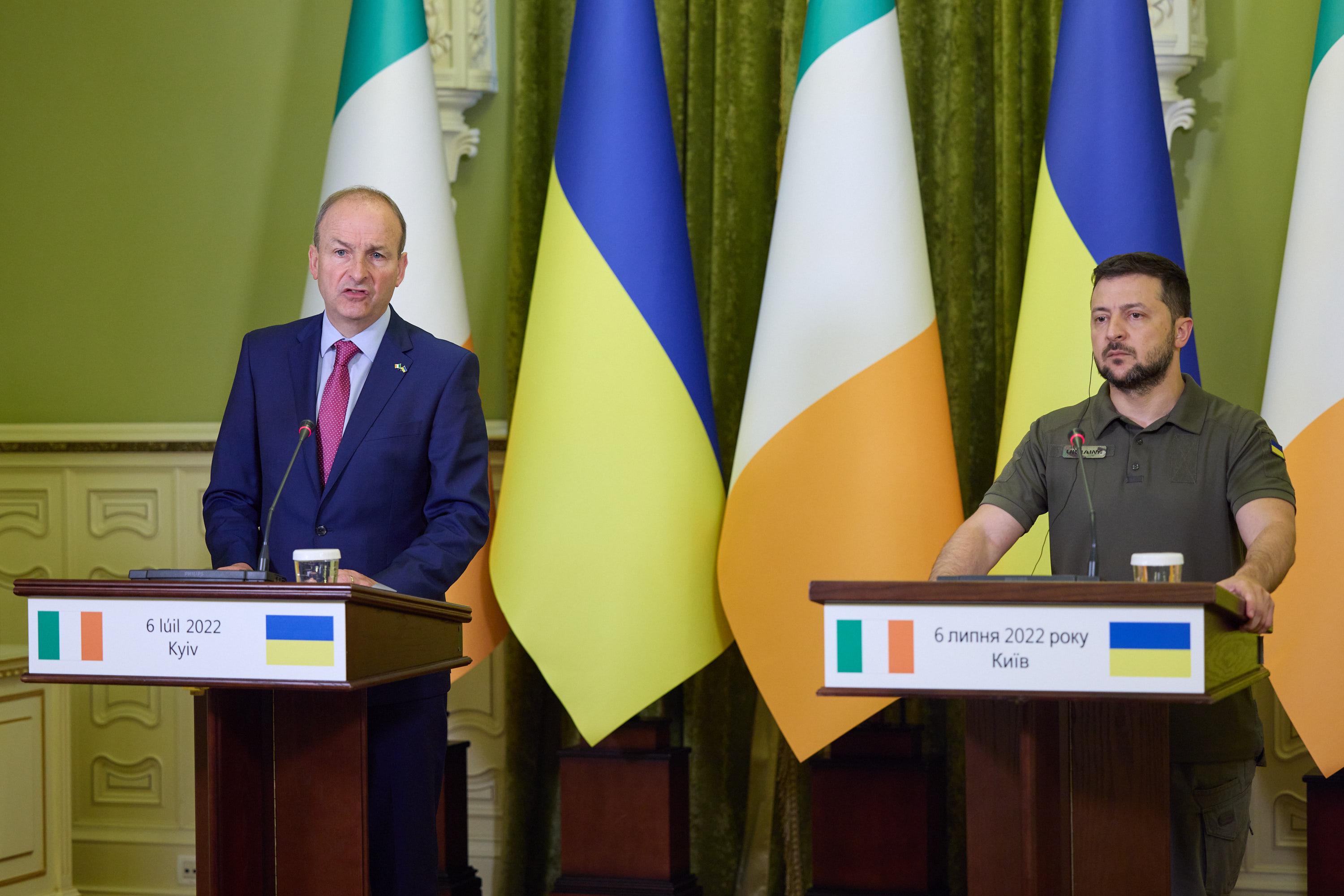
Martin with Ukrainian President Volodymyr Zelenskyy in Kyiv, Ukraine in July 2022

Late on 16 March 2022, Martin tested positive for COVID-19 while he was at an event in Washington, D.C., United States, being held for St Patrick's Day. This meant Martin could not personally meet President of the United States Joe Biden at the White House as planned the next day. Biden and Martin met virtually instead, with Martin isolating in Blair House. Unable to return to Ireland as planned, Martin planned to chair the next cabinet meeting from the Irish embassy in Washington.

Martin made an official visit to Ukraine in July 2022 amidst the Russian invasion of Ukraine. This was the first official visit made by a Taoiseach to Ukraine. Martin stated he would provide support for Ukraine joining the European Union and condemned attacks on civilians.

As part of the 2020 coalition agreement between Fianna Fáil, Fine Gael and the Green Party, Martin resigned as Taoiseach on 17 December 2022 to allow the appointment of Leo Varadkar as Taoiseach and the formation of a new government, which will be a continuation of the tri-party coalition for the remainder of the 33rd Dáil.

== Tánaiste, Foreign Affairs and Defence roles (2022–2025) ==
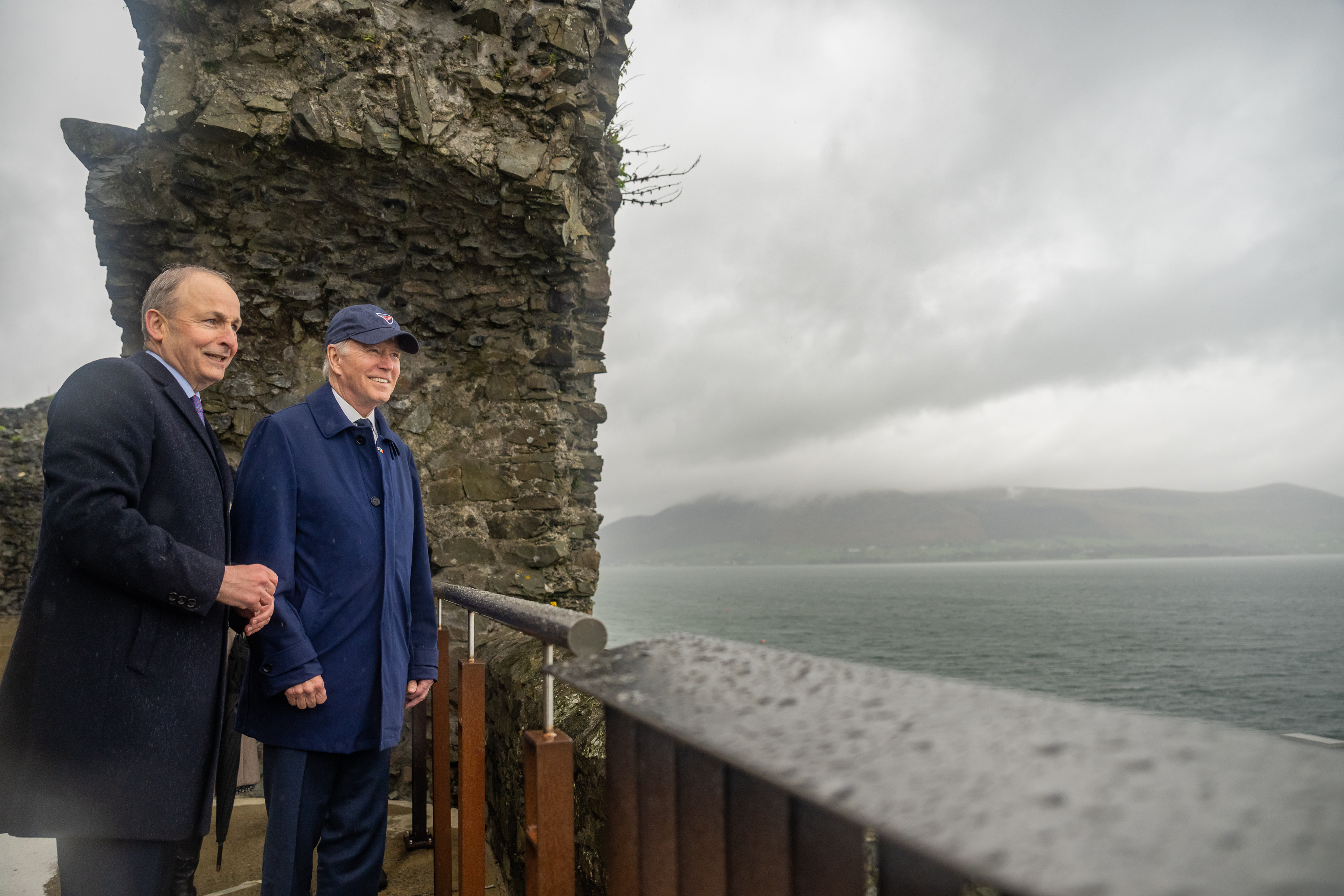
Martin meets with U.S. president Joe Biden at Carlingford Castle in April 2023

On 17 December 2022, Martin was appointed Tánaiste, Minister for Foreign Affairs and Minister for Defence in a cabinet reshuffle after Leo Varadkar's appointment as Taoiseach.

On 12 April 2023, Martin met with U.S. president Joe Biden as he toured Carlingford Castle and Dundalk in County Louth, during Biden's four-day visit to the island of Ireland.

In 2023, Martin launched the Consultative Forum on International Security Policy, a 4-day, 3-city conference on the subject of International security, to be held in June. The programme for the forum has been criticised by the President Michael D. Higgins.

In March 2024, Martin criticised the Israeli blockade of the Gaza Strip, saying that "The use of starvation as a weapon of war is a blatant violation of international humanitarian law."

== Taoiseach (2025–present) ==
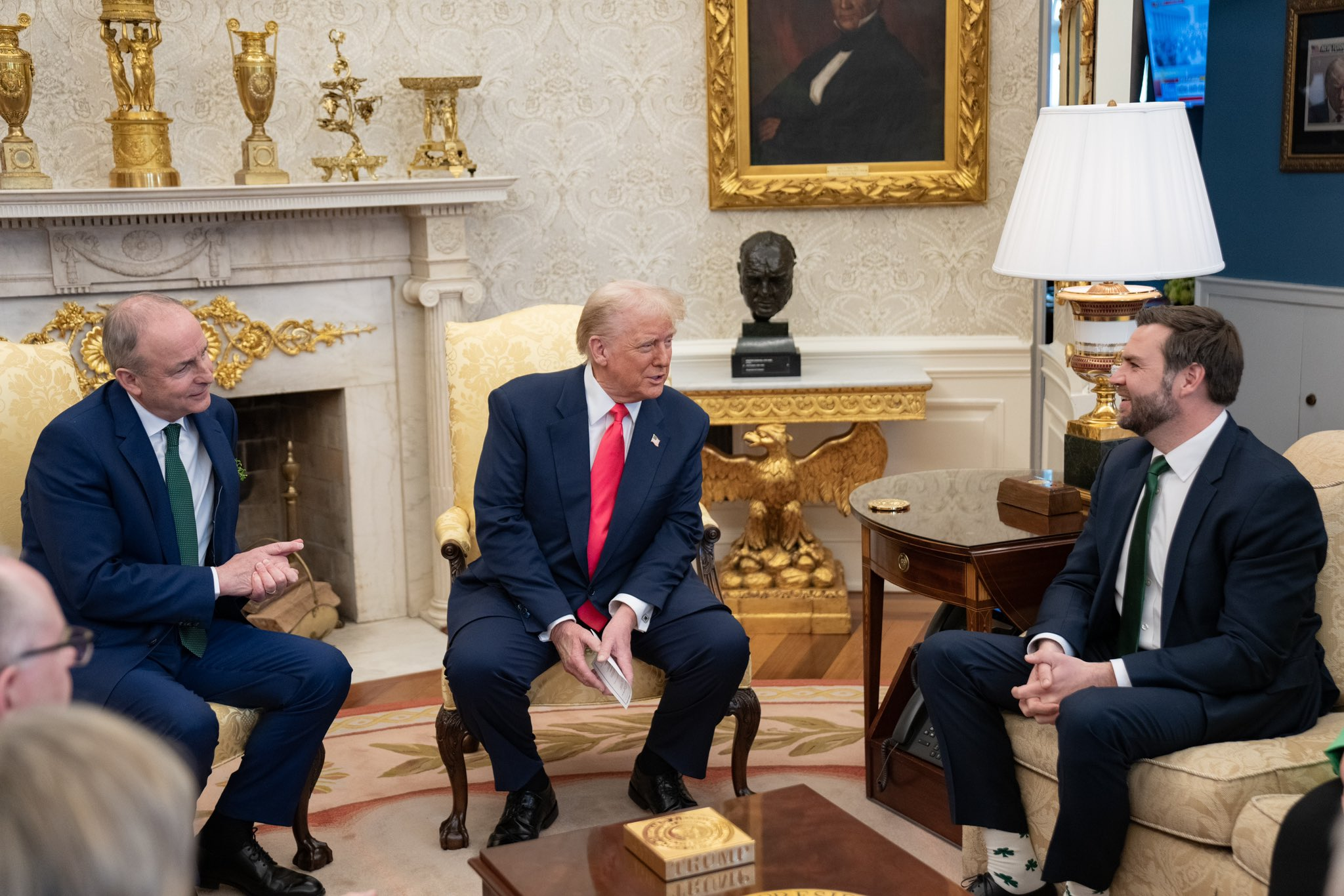
U.S President Donald Trump and Vice President JD Vance meet with Micheál Martin in the Oval Office

At the 2024 general election, Martin was re-elected to the Dáil. Martin was awarded "Politician of the Year" by the Journal for his performance and election result. He was elected again as Taoiseach in a 95–76 vote by the Dáil on 23 January 2025 following a coalition agreement between Fianna Fáil, Fine Gael and with the support of several independent TDs.

In March 2025, Martin condemned the renewed Israeli attacks on the Gaza Strip and called on all parties to respect the ceasefire and the agreement to release hostages.

Following the poor performance of Fianna Fáil in the 2025 presidential election, senior TDs Willie O'Dea, Seán Ó Fearghaíl and Pat 'the Cope' Gallagher issued a statement criticising Martin's handling of the campaign and its aftermath, with reference to "the top-down autocratic style of politics" within the internal culture of the party.

== Electoral results ==
Elections to the Dáil
Party	Election		FPv	FPv%	Result
Fianna Fáil	Cork South-Central	1987	3,619	6.4	Eliminated on count 6/10
Fianna Fáil	Cork South-Central	1989	6,564	12.2	Elected on count 7/7
Fianna Fáil	Cork South-Central	1992	7,939	14.8	Elected on count 11/15
Fianna Fáil	Cork South-Central	1997	9,652	17.5	Elected on count 1/9
Fianna Fáil	Cork South-Central	2002	14,742	26.7	Elected on count 1/10
Fianna Fáil	Cork South-Central	2007	11,226	19.0	Elected on count 1/6
Fianna Fáil	Cork South-Central	2011	10,715	16.7	Elected on count 1/12
Fianna Fáil	Cork South-Central	2016	11,346	20.4	Elected on count 1/11
Fianna Fáil	Cork South-Central	2020	11,023	19.3	Elected on count 6/8
Fianna Fáil	Cork South-Central	2024	14,526	23.2	Elected on count 1/18

== Political views ==
In the early part of his career, Martin was considered to be a social conservative. However, after Martin altered his positions on abortion and same-sex marriage, it was considered that he had become more of a "centrist". In 2023, Jack Sheehan of the Irish Times described Fianna Fáil and Martin by stating "for a decade now, a socially conservative, supposedly republican party has been led by a centrist social liberal with a more cautious position on Irish unification than even Leo Varadkar."

=== Abortion ===
Prior to the 2010s, Martin opposed the legislation of abortion in Ireland.

In 2017, following discussions by the Citizens' Assembly, it became clear that there would be a referendum on the legality of abortion in Ireland. This prompted all political parties in Ireland to reexamine their positions on abortion in depth. Following internal debates, a majority of Fianna Fáil declared a "pro-life" position. However, Martin "shocked" his party when he came out in favour of permitting abortion and later would endorse a Yes vote in the 2018 abortion referendum. Martin stated that his views had evolved after he heard testimony from women speaking about their pregnancies in the Oireachtas and that he had become simultaneously both "pro-life" and "pro-choice";

I think certain groups throughout the years have appropriated the term 'pro-life' to themselves and [claim] anyone who doesn't agree with an absolutist position is not pro-life, but I don't accept that. All my instincts are pro-life, and I would argue that changing the law in itself is not going to change the women or doctors of Ireland into abortionists. We must trust women and trust doctors. I don't believe in the two labels: of course you can be pro-life and pro-choice...To try and say that someone who advocates a humane response to very traumatic situations for women is anti-life, or not pro-life, is wrong".

Members of Fianna Fáil were not placed under a party whip on abortion and were free to vote and campaign either for or against abortion based on their personal views. By the time of the referendum itself, a majority of the Fianna Fáil parliamentary party supported a No vote.

=== Cannabis ===
During a 2022 Dáil debate on legislation to decriminalise cannabis, Martin stated his concern about cannabis being "glamorised" and mentioned "real concerns within the health community" about cannabis. In 2023, as Tánaiste, Martin stated he was "concerned" about the legalisation of cannabis, but expressed his support for decriminalisation.

=== Economics ===
Speaking in 2024, Martin described himself as an advocate of free trade and specifically a supporter of EU-wide trade deals such as the CETA agreement with Canada. Martin contrasted himself against other Irish politicians who he suggested were more protectionist. Martin stressed the importance of foreign direct investment and suggested some Irish political parties take it "for granted".

=== LGBT issues ===
In 2012, Martin clashed with Taoiseach Enda Kenny over the issue of same-sex marriage; Martin needled Kenny in the Dáil to declare a firm position on same-sex marriage and urged him to press ahead with a referendum. In 2015, Martin supported a Yes vote in the 2015 marriage equality referendum. In 2019, Martin voiced his support for a similar referendum in Northern Ireland. In 2021, Martin condemned legislation passed in Hungary which prohibited gay people from featuring in educational material, describing it as "unacceptable" and saying a strong response was needed from the European Union.

In 2021, Martin expressed openness to changing laws regarding transgender teenagers and self-identification, stating he believed that "we should consult young trans people to hear their views". In a 2022 interview with NXF, Martin said he had "no time" for a "toxic" discussion on transgender people, saying "acceptance is key" and "we should fully accept and acknowledge their identity in the first instance".

=== Physical-force Irish republicanism ===
Martin, citing Jon Boutcher of Operation Kenova, Say Nothing by Patrick Radden Keefe, and Killing Thatcher by Rory Carroll says he believes the Troubles was a "futile war" in which the Provisional IRA did "more damage to their own people" than otherwise. Martin has said that period of history should never be "triumphalised" and those born after the conflict should not be led to believe there was any glory in it. Martin also attributes the Troubles as a major contributor to the economic depression felt in Ireland during the 1970s and 1980s.

== Personal life ==
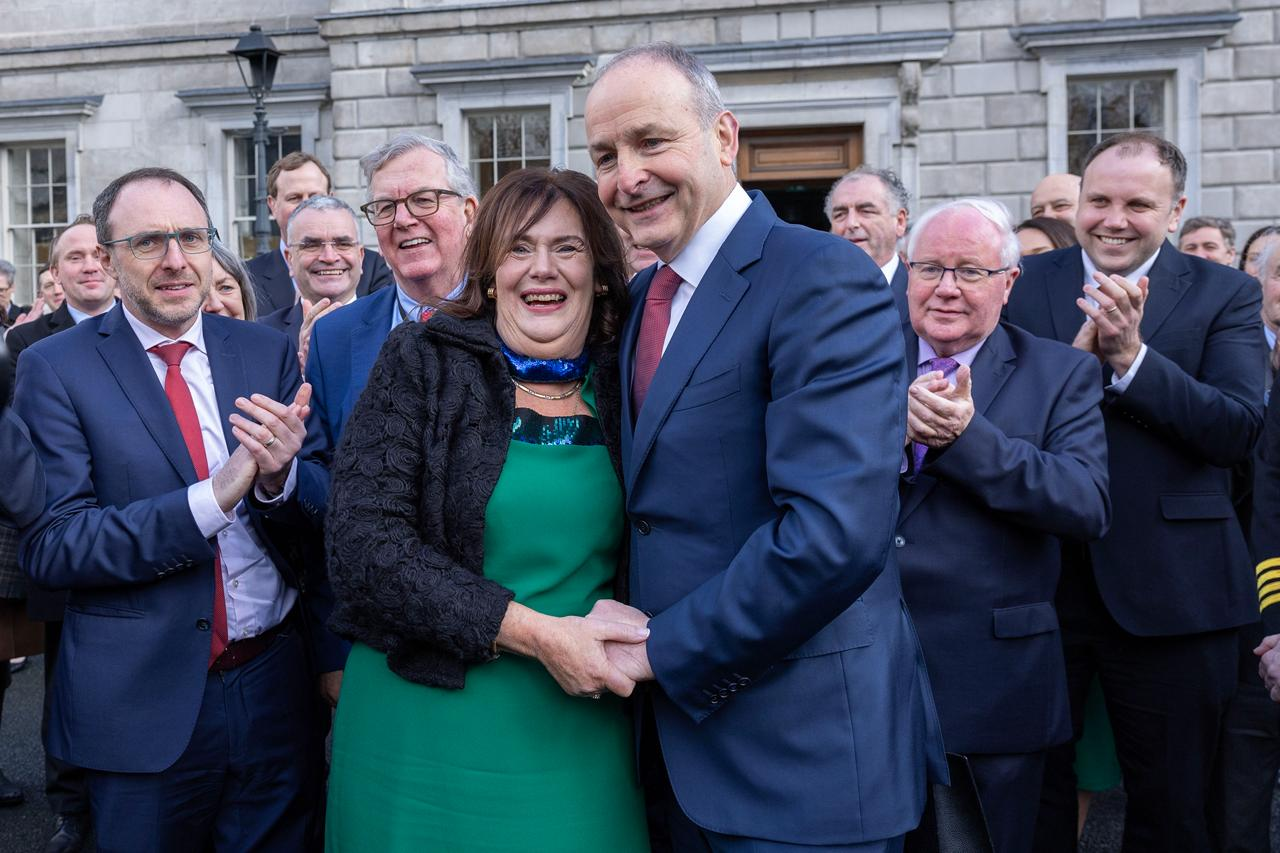
Martin with his wife Mary upon becoming Taoiseach for a second time in 2025

Martin met Mary O'Shea at university; they later married in 1990 and had a total of five children. Their son, Ruairí, died at five weeks old in 2000 from sudden infant death syndrome. Their seven-year-old daughter, Léana, died in October 2010 shortly before her eighth birthday at London's Great Ormond Street Hospital after suffering from a heart condition. His three other children include Micheál Aodh.

== Publications ==
- Micheál Martin, Freedom to Choose: Cork & Party Politics in Ireland 1918–1932 (The Collins Press, Cork, 2009).

== See also ==
- 2020s in Irish history
- List of current heads of state and government
- List of heads of the executive by approval rating

== Sources ==
- Katie Hannon (2004). The Naked Politician. Gill & Macmillan. ISBN 978-0-7171-3694-0.

Civic offices
Preceded by Denis Cregan	Lord Mayor of Cork; 1992–1993	Succeeded by John Murray
Political offices
Preceded by Niamh Bhreathnach	Minister for Education and Science; 1997–2000	Succeeded by Michael Woods
Preceded by Brian Cowen	Minister for Health and Children; 2000–2004	Succeeded by Mary Harney
Preceded by Mary Harney	Minister for Enterprise, Trade and Employment; 2004–2008	Succeeded by Mary Coughlan
Preceded by Dermot Ahern	Minister for Foreign Affairs; 2008–2011	Succeeded by Brian Cowen
Preceded by Enda Kenny	Leader of the Opposition; 2011–2020	Succeeded by Mary Lou McDonald
Preceded by Leo Varadkar	Taoiseach; 2020–2022	Succeeded by Leo Varadkar
Preceded by Leo Varadkar	Tánaiste; 2022–2025	Succeeded by Simon Harris
Preceded by Simon Coveney	Minister for Foreign Affairs; 2022–2025	Succeeded by Simon Harris
Preceded by Simon Coveney	Minister for Defence; 2022–2025	Succeeded by Simon Harris
Preceded by Simon Harris	Taoiseach; 2025–present	Incumbent
Party political offices
Preceded by Brian Cowen	Leader of Fianna Fáil; 2011–present	Incumbent

Dáil	Election	Deputy (Party)	Deputy (Party)	Deputy (Party)	Deputy (Party)	Deputy (Party)
22nd	1981	Eileen Desmond (Lab)	Gene Fitzgerald (FF)	Pearse Wyse (FF)	Hugh Coveney (FG)	Peter Barry (FG)
23rd	1982 (Feb)	Eileen Desmond (Lab)	Gene Fitzgerald (FF)	Pearse Wyse (FF)	Jim Corr (FG)	Peter Barry (FG)
24th	1982 (Nov)	Eileen Desmond (Lab)	Gene Fitzgerald (FF)	Pearse Wyse (FF)	Hugh Coveney (FG)	Peter Barry (FG)
25th	1987	Toddy O'Sullivan (Lab)	John Dennehy (FF)	Batt O'Keeffe (FF)	Pearse Wyse (PDs)	Peter Barry (FG)
26th	1989	Toddy O'Sullivan (Lab)	John Dennehy (FF)	Micheál Martin (FF)	Pearse Wyse (PDs)	Peter Barry (FG)
27th	1992	Toddy O'Sullivan (Lab)	Batt O'Keeffe (FF)	Micheál Martin (FF)	Pat Cox (PDs)	Peter Barry (FG)
27th	1994 by-election	Toddy O'Sullivan (Lab)	Batt O'Keeffe (FF)	Micheál Martin (FF)	Hugh Coveney (FG)	Peter Barry (FG)
28th	1997	John Dennehy (FF)	Batt O'Keeffe (FF)	Micheál Martin (FF)	Hugh Coveney (FG)	Deirdre Clune (FG)
28th	1998 by-election	John Dennehy (FF)	Batt O'Keeffe (FF)	Micheál Martin (FF)	Simon Coveney (FG)	Deirdre Clune (FG)
29th	2002	John Dennehy (FF)	Batt O'Keeffe (FF)	Micheál Martin (FF)	Simon Coveney (FG)	Dan Boyle (GP)
30th	2007	Ciarán Lynch (Lab)	Michael McGrath (FF)	Micheál Martin (FF)	Simon Coveney (FG)	Deirdre Clune (FG)
31st	2011	Ciarán Lynch (Lab)	Michael McGrath (FF)	Micheál Martin (FF)	Simon Coveney (FG)	Jerry Buttimer (FG)
32nd	2016	Donnchadh Ó Laoghaire (SF)	Michael McGrath (FF)	Micheál Martin (FF)	Simon Coveney (FG)	4 seats 2016–2024
33rd	2020	Donnchadh Ó Laoghaire (SF)	Michael McGrath (FF)	Micheál Martin (FF)	Simon Coveney (FG)	4 seats 2016–2024
34th	2024	Donnchadh Ó Laoghaire (SF)	Séamus McGrath (FF)	Micheál Martin (FF)	Jerry Buttimer (FG)	Pádraig Rice (SD)
