= James Irvine (chemist) =

British organic chemist (1877–1952)

Sir James Irvine KBE FRS FRSE FEIS

Principal of the University of St Andrews
- In office 1921–1952
- Preceded by: Sir John Herkless
- Succeeded by: Sir Thomas Malcolm Knox

Principal of University College, Dundee
- In office 1930–1939
- Preceded by: John Yule Mackay
- Succeeded by: Angus Robertson Fulton

Personal details
- Born: 9 May 1877 Glasgow, Scotland
- Died: 12 June 1952 (aged 75) St Andrews, Fife, Scotland
- Spouse: Mabel Violet Williams (m. 1905)
- Education: Allan Glen's School; Royal Technical College; University of St Andrews; University of Leipzig
- Scientific career
- Awards: Davy Medal (1925); Willard Gibbs Award (1926); Elliott Cresson Medal (1929); Longstaff Prize (1933)
- Fields: Organic chemistry

Sir James Colquhoun Irvine KBE FRS FRSE FEIS (9 May 1877 – 12 June 1952) was a British organic chemist and Principal and Vice-Chancellor of the University of St Andrews from 1921 until his death. As a research chemist, Irvine worked on the application of methylation techniques to carbohydrates, and isolated the first methylated sugars, trimethyl and tetramethyl glucose.

== Life ==
Irvine was born in Glasgow to factory owner John Irvine (a manufacturer of light-castings) and Mary Paton Colquhoun. He was educated at Allan Glen's School.

He then studied at the Royal Technical College, Glasgow, before taking a Bachelor of Science in Chemistry at the University of St Andrews. From there, he went to the University of Leipzig, where he studied for a PhD under Ostwald and Wislicenus. Returning to St Andrews, he was awarded a Doctor of Science degree, and taught Chemistry there. He was appointed Professor of Chemistry in 1909 and Dean of Science in 1912. In 1921, he was appointed Principal. His tenure saw the renovation and restoration of both buildings and traditions, and his works are still talked of today. His commitments spanned further than the University, into higher education in Britain and the colonies. He also served as acting Principal of University College Dundee.

He was elected a Fellow of the Royal Society of Edinburgh in 1917. His proposers were Sir James Walker, John Edwin Mackenzie, Cargill Gilston Knott, and Sir D'Arcy Wentworth Thompson. He was elected a Fellow of The Royal Society of London in 1918 also being awarded its Davy Medal. He served as Vice-President of the Royal Society of Edinburgh from 1922 to 1925. He was elected an International Member of the American Philosophical Society in 1933. He won the society's Gunning Victoria Jubilee Prize for 1936–1940.

Irvine was also Willard Gibbs Medallist of the American Chemical Society, Elliot Cressan Medallist of the Franklin Institute, Longstaff Medallist of the Chemical Society of London.

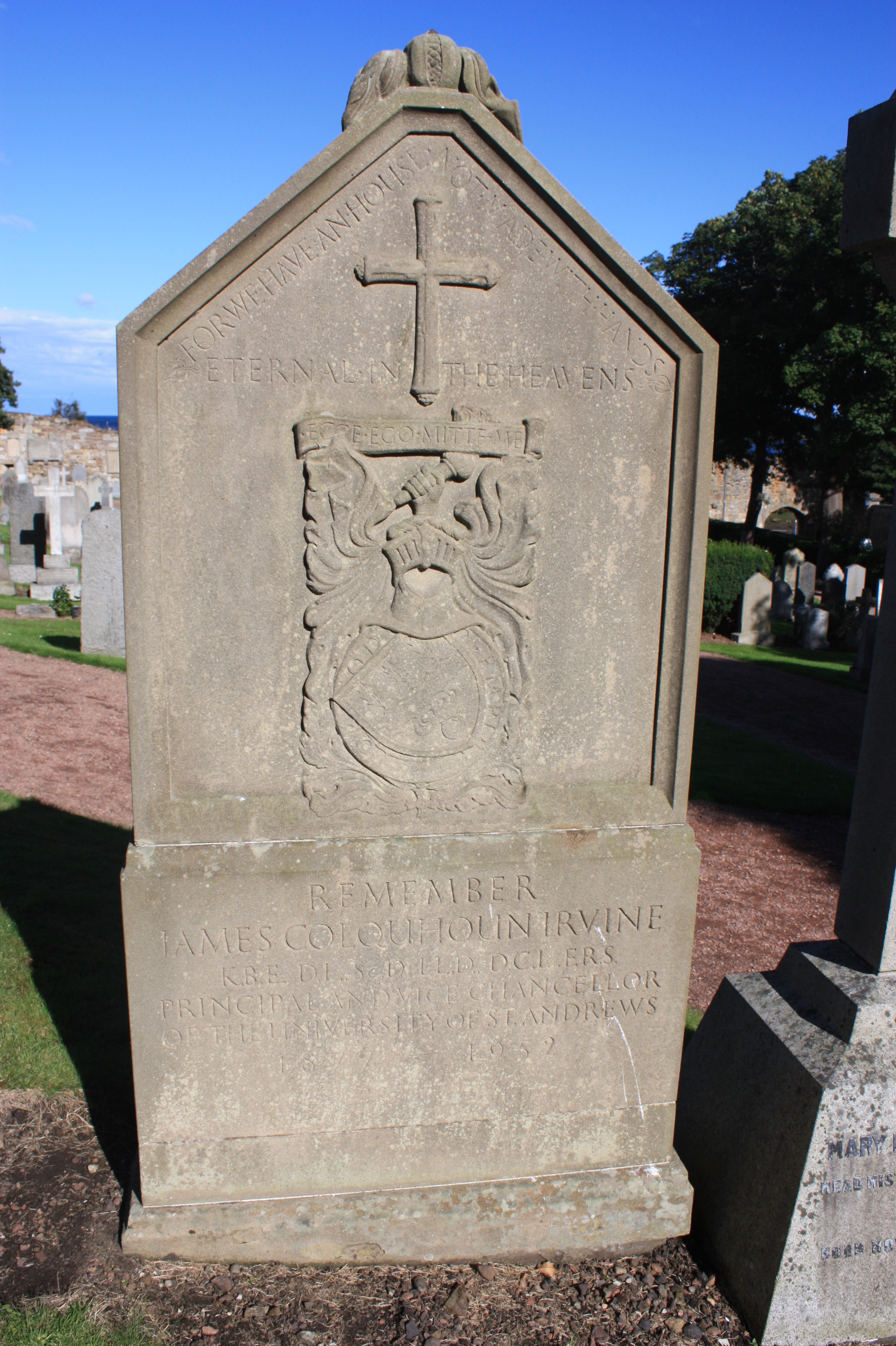
The grave of James Colquhoun Irvine, East Cemetery, St Andrews

He was made a Commander of the Order of the British Empire in 1920 and knighted in 1925 and was awarded the Freedom of St Andrews.

He received honorary doctorates from the Universities of Aberdeen, Cambridge, Columbia, Durham, Edinburgh, Glasgow, Liverpool, McGill, Oxford, Princeton, Toronto, Wales and Yale.

He died at home in St Andrews on 12 June 1952 and was buried in the eastern cemetery close to the main lower entrance gate.

== Publications ==
- Advances in Carbohydrate Chemistry (1953)

== Family ==
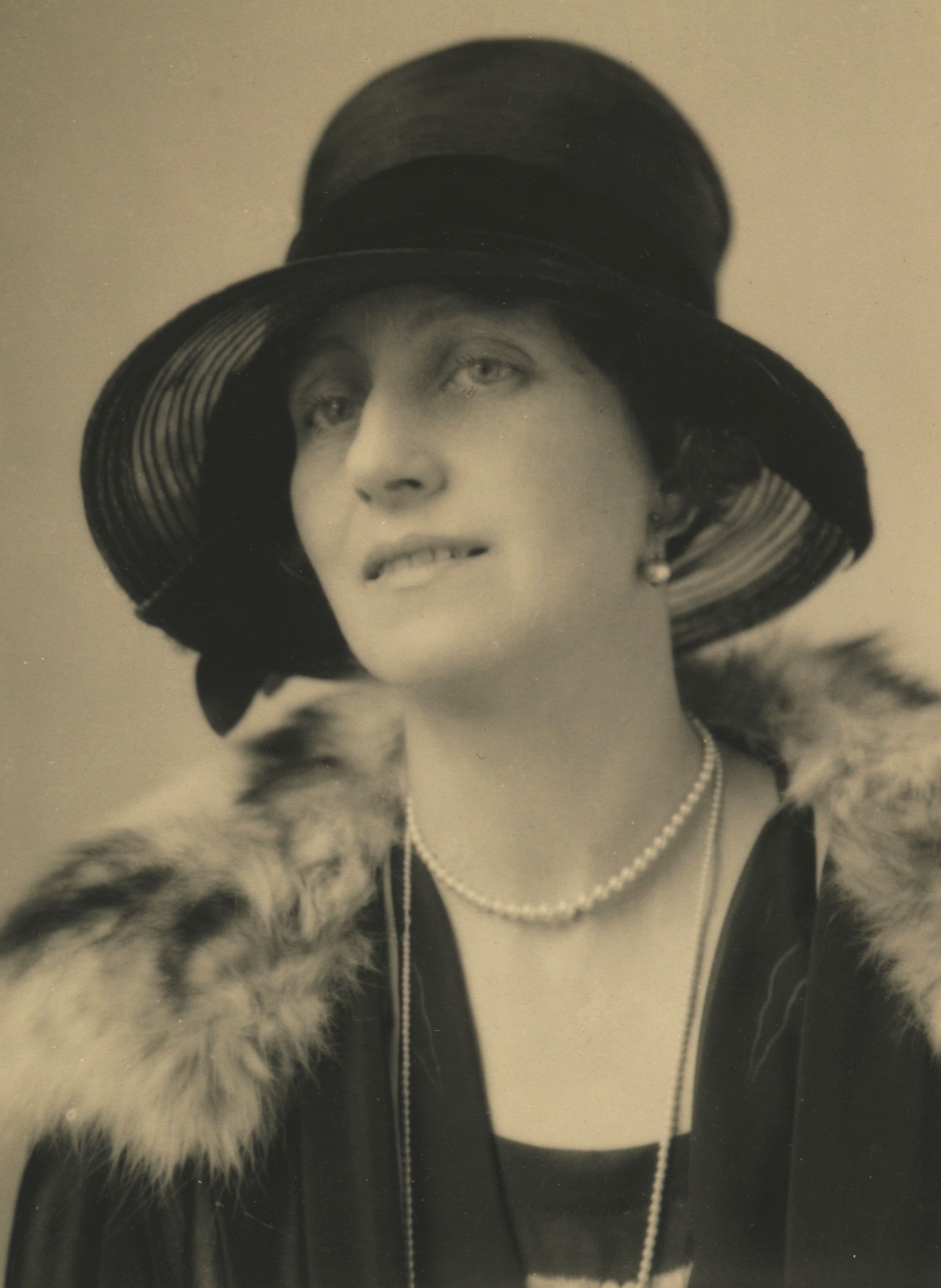
Mabel Violet Irvine

Irvine married Mabel Violet Williams in 1905.

Academic offices
Preceded by Sir John Herkless	Principal of University of St Andrews; 1921–1952	Succeeded by Sir Thomas Malcolm Knox
Preceded by John Yule Mackay	Principal of University College, Dundee; 1930–1939	Succeeded by Angus Robertson Fulton (interim)
