= Louise Richardson =

Irish political scientist (born 1958)

Dame Louise Richardson DBE FRSE
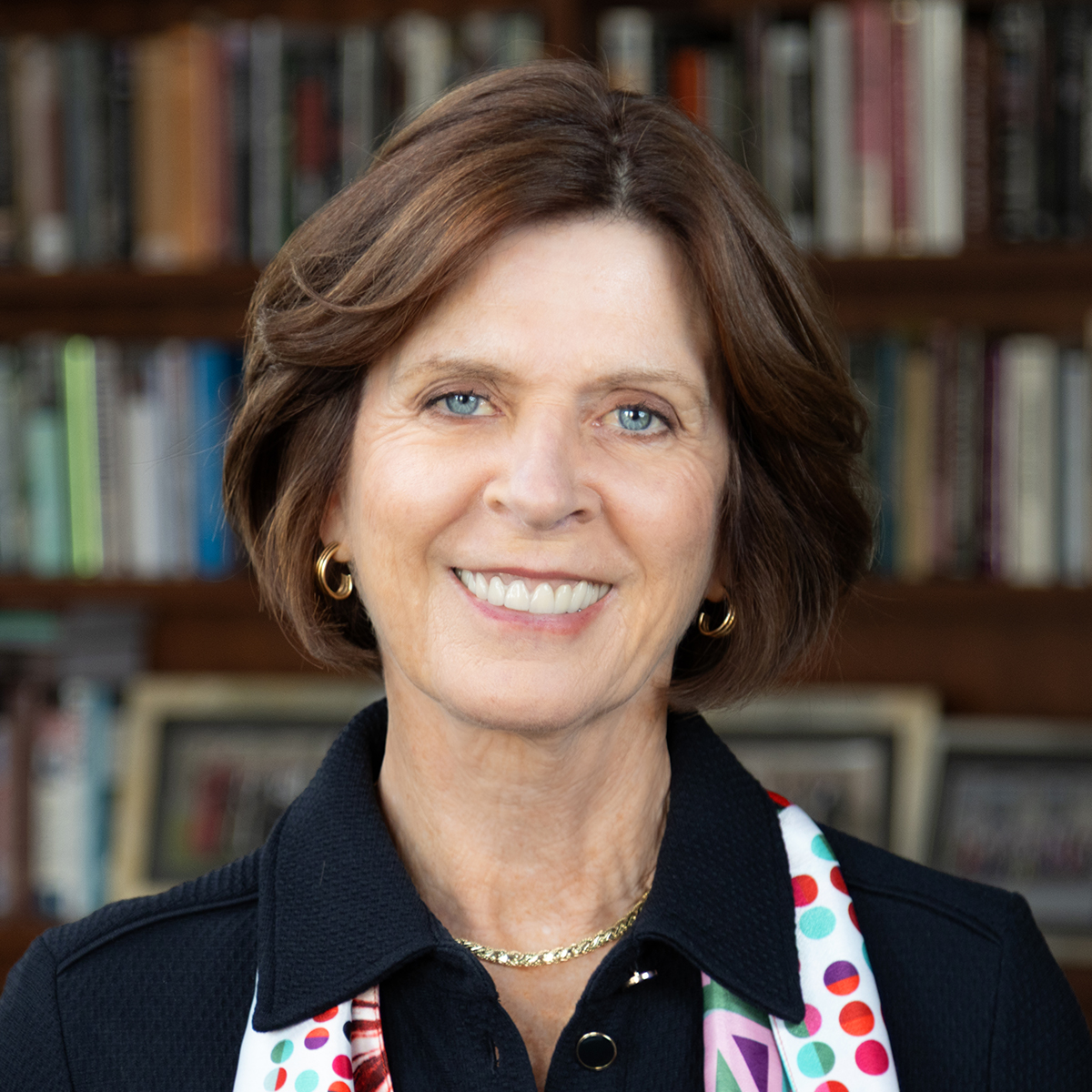
- Richardson in 2025

President of the Carnegie Corporation of New York
- Incumbent
- Assumed office January 2023
- Preceded by: Vartan Gregorian

Vice-Chancellor of the University of Oxford
- In office 1 January 2016 – 31 December 2022
- Chancellor: Chris Patten
- Preceded by: Andrew Hamilton
- Succeeded by: Irene Tracey

Principal and Vice-Chancellor of the University of St Andrews
- In office 6 January 2009 – 31 December 2015
- Chancellor: The Lord Campbell of Pittenweem
- Preceded by: Brian Lang
- Succeeded by: Dame Sally Mapstone

Personal details
- Born: Louise Mary Richardson; 8 June 1958 (age 68) Tramore, Ireland
- Citizenship: Ireland, United States, United Kingdom
- Spouse: Thomas Jevon (m. 1988)
- Children: 3
- Education: Trinity College Dublin (BA); University of California, Los Angeles (MA); Harvard University (MA, PhD)
- Awards: Levenson Memorial Teaching Award (2000); Fellow of the Royal Society of Edinburgh (2010); Harvard's Graduate School of Arts and Sciences Centennial Medal (2013); Fellow of the Academy of Social Sciences (2016); Honorary member of Royal Irish Academy (2016); Member of American Philosophical Society (2017)
- Scientific career
- Thesis: Managing Allies and Being Managed by Alliances: Suez and the Falklands (1988)

Dame Louise Mary Richardson DBE FRSE (born 8 June 1958) is an Irish political scientist whose specialist field is the study of terrorism. In January 2023, she became president of the philanthropic foundation, Carnegie Corporation of New York. In January 2016, she became the first female vice-chancellor of the University of Oxford, having formerly been the principal and vice-chancellor of the University of St Andrews, and as the executive dean of the Radcliffe Institute for Advanced Study at Harvard University. Her leadership at the University of Oxford played an important role in the successful development of a vaccine to combat COVID-19.

== Life ==
Richardson grew up in Tramore, County Waterford, one of seven children of Arthur and Julie Richardson. After attending primary school at The Star of the Sea convent girls' school in Tramore, and St Angela's Secondary School, Ursuline Convent, Waterford, In 1976, she received a Rotary Scholarship to study at the University of California for one year, then returned to Trinity College Dublin to obtain a Bachelor of Arts degree in history in 1980.

As an undergraduate, Richardson was a student activist and chair of the campus Anti-Apartheid Society, which opposed the South African government's racist policies.

After Trinity College Dublin, Richardson took an MA degree in political science from UCLA in 1981, followed by a move to Harvard, where she received a Master of Arts degree in government in 1984 and a PhD in 1989 on how allies manage crises in which interests diverge, relating specifically to the Falklands War and Suez Crisis.

Based on her earlier involvement with the anti-apartheid movement, Richardson joined the supporters who travelled to Johannesburg in 1985 with the Dunnes Stores strikers — Irish workers who had walked off the job after refusing to handle fruit from South Africa. Archbishop Desmond Tutu had invited the group to see the living conditions under apartheid, but when they landed in the country, they were detained at the airport by armed security guards. The workers were denied entry, creating an international uproar, while Richardson and two researchers stayed on to conduct interviews on conditions, working alongside the South African Council of Churches.

She is married to Thomas Jevon, a physician based in Massachusetts. They have three adult children.

== Career ==
=== Harvard University ===
From 1989 to 2001, Richardson was as an assistant professor and then associate professor in the Department of Government at Harvard University. During this period she was also for eight years head tutor and chair of the board of tutors (Director of Undergraduate Studies) in the Department of Government. Richardson continued to work in numerous administrative capacities at Harvard, including the Faculty Council and various committees concerned with undergraduate education, the status of women, and human rights.

Richardson's academic focus was on international security with an emphasis on terrorist movements in the 1990s. When Harvard's Graduate School of Arts and Sciences presented its Centennial Award for distinguished alumni to Richardson in 2013, the official citation noted her contributions to the field: "The lessons she began to teach us — before we knew how much we needed them — grow more relevant with each new incident of terror our world faces."

Richardson taught Harvard's large undergraduate lecture course, Terrorist Movements in International Relations, for which she won the Levenson Prize, awarded by the undergraduate student body to the best teachers at the university. This class, along with a number of graduate courses on terrorist movements and European terrorism, were for many years the only courses offered on the subject at Harvard. Richardson also received teaching awards from the American Political Science Association and Pi Sigma Alpha for outstanding teaching in political science; the Abramson Award in recognition of her "excellence and sensitivity in teaching undergraduates" and many awards from the Bok Center for Teaching Excellence.

=== Radcliffe Institute for Advanced Study ===
In July 2001, Richardson was appointed executive dean of the Radcliffe Institute for Advanced Study. She was instrumental in the transformation of Radcliffe, after it formally merged with Harvard University in 1999. Richardson helped turn the former women's college into an interdisciplinary center promoting scholarship across a wide range of academic fields and the creative arts. According to the Radcliffe Quarterly, Richardson was central to all administrative and academic activities. She managed the budget, infrastructure, and staff, while also overseeing a dramatic, multiyear renovation of three iconic buildings: the Schlesinger Library, the Radcliffe Gym, and Byerly Hall.

Richardson's scholarly profile at Radcliffe increased after the September 11 attacks, and her expertise helped to shield Harvard from criticism about the paucity of its terrorism course offerings. Richardson was asked to give lectures to a variety of audiences – policymakers, the military, intelligence agencies and business communities – as well as testifying before the US Senate. She continued to teach, both at Harvard College and Harvard Law School, and to write extensively.

==== Author of What Terrorists Want ====
In 2006, Richardson authored her first of several books, What Terrorists Want: Understanding the Enemy, Containing the Threat, about the roots of terrorism and the Bush Administration's counterterrorism policies. The New York Times called it "the overdue and essential primer on terrorism and how to tackle it," while the Financial Times said it was a rare academic work, "a bestseller with no trade-off between accessibility and scholarly rigour." And the New York Review of Books commented: "One would like to see the entire US national security establishment frog-marched into Richardson's Terrorism 101."

=== University of St. Andrews ===
In 2009, Richardson was appointed principal of the University of St Andrews, succeeding Brian Lang. Her installation took place on 25 March 2009. She is the first woman, as well as the first Roman Catholic in modern times, to occupy the position. She was appointed professor of international relations at St Andrews in November 2010.

==== Private clubs and gender equality ====
Unlike previous principals, Richardson was not granted honorary membership to the Royal and Ancient Golf Club, which was all-male. Richardson spoke out about how the membership policies interfered with fundraising and the values of the university. Richardson characterized her general disapproval of elite, private clubs saying, "I understand people's desire to want to surround themselves with people like themselves. Where it becomes a problem, it seems to me, is when that group of people have access to a unique set of privileges from which others are excluded at birth." Richardson's concerns helped mobilize a drive to admit women, and in 2014, members of the golf club voted to change the policy.

In 2009, Richardson took another controversial stand by withdrawing official recognition of the Kate Kennedy Club. The all-male student organization hosted an annual parade and fundraiser that was known for being drunken and rowdy. Richardson wrote, "The official endorsement of any club or society which excludes people because of their gender or race would be completely at odds with the values of this university and our commitment to foster an open and inclusive international community of scholars and students at St. Andrews."

==== 600-year anniversary and fundraising ====
Between 2011 and 2013, Richardson oversaw a range of activities surrounding the 600-year anniversary. As part of the celebrations, she joined a relay team of cyclists traveling 1600 miles to retrace the route of the institution's founding documents known as the papal bulls. They were issued by the Avignon pope Benedict XIII (Pedro de Luna) in 1413 and carried from Peniscola in Spain to St. Andrews in an historic journey that the cyclists recreated by pedalling 60 miles per day.

Richardson leveraged the anniversary to pursue a $150 million fundraising campaign that she had inherited. She enlisted alumni, including the Duke and Duchess of Cambridge — Prince William and Princess Kate, who hosted a dinner at the Metropolitan Museum of Art in New York City, raising more than $3 million toward student scholarships. Richardson also invited Scottish screen legend Sir Sean Connery to produce a film about St. Andrews and then persuaded the actor to come out of retirement to appear in production. The documentary "Ever to Excel" premiered in 2012 as part of a fundraiser in New York City.

In separate efforts, Richardson raised private and government funds to allow St Andrews to purchase a former papermill in the nearby village of Guardbridge in 2010 and to convert it into a $35 million-dollar green energy center. Richardson also raised more than $2 million to fund St. Andrews's acquisition of a beloved local church in 2012. The vacant Martyrs Kirk church was transformed into a postgraduate library and a special collections reading room.

Richardson insisted universities should not be afraid to look abroad for support from legitimate donors and charities. She rebuffed criticisms over donor influence saying, "Any academic who tailors research to suit a donor is not worthy of the name."

==== Rankings and student access ====
Under Richardson, investments in research resulted in the opening of a new school of medical and biological sciences in 2010, and similar investments were credited with helping to improve St. Andrews' national and international rankings. They reached as high as 85 worldwide on the Times Higher Education list of 2012 and as high as 39 for scientific performance on the Leiden Ranking of 2014.

Richardson focused on St. Andrew's global brand and its ability to attract international students. She also prioritized increasing access among students from disadvantaged backgrounds. In 2015, after seven years as principal, the number of pupils on outreach programmes was 1772, up from 235 in 2008, the year before she took over.

==== Freedom of speech ====
In 2014, just before the referendum on Scottish independence, it was revealed that Richardson had resisted pressure by then First Minister Alex Salmond to tone down her comments on the impact of Scottish independence on research universities, and resisted pressure from Salmond to issue a statement praising the SNP government.

To protect her academic staff from external pressures to support the Scottish government's position in the referendum, Richardson issued a statement saying they were free to state their personal opinions, insisting that the public looked to universities for reasoned debate. In 2015, Richardson again criticized the Scottish government, saying it was interfering with the running of higher education institutions and creating an excessive regulatory bureaucracy. These incidents helped define Richardson as a "champion of free thought" with a "ferocious independent spirit" according to a column about her tenure at St. Andrews published in The Daily Telegraph of London.

=== University of Oxford ===
On 28 May 2015, the University of Oxford announced that Richardson had been nominated as the next vice-chancellor, subject to approval, to take up the post on 1 January 2016. The nomination was approved on 25 June 2015, and Richardson became the university's first female vice-chancellor in January 2016. She was also an Honorary Fellow at Kellogg College, Oxford.

==== Institutional reforms ====
In October 2017, Richardson claimed that Oxford University was in need of reform, stating that the current system gives rise to "a waste of resources" and a "duplication of bureaucracy". At her annual Oration, she stated, "We all know that change occurs slowly at Oxford…but the world is changing rapidly around us, and I believe that if we stand still we will enter a period of slow but definite decline." By 2022, Richardson was still advocating for her "One Oxford agenda" to encourage collaboration between the central university and the university's 39 financially independent and self-governing colleges.

==== Funding and fundraising ====
In an interview with the Daily Telegraph in July 2019 Richardson addressed the issue of higher education funding in the UK, noting that "Our American competitors are so far ahead of us in fundraising". Her approach was to explore alternative sources of funding, including investments from the capital markets, public-private partnerships, and philanthropic support.

In December 2017, Oxford raised £750 million through a century bond issuance (increased to £1 billion in 2020). It was a first for the university and the biggest amount raised this way by a UK university. Richardson helped negotiate several major partnerships for Oxford: In 2017, Novo Nordisk invested £115 million in a new research center focused on type 2 Diabetes; in 2019, Legal and General agreed to invest £4 billion in staff housing and science facilities; and in 2021, manufacturing company Ineos donated £100 million to establish a center for research into the global issue of antimicrobial resistance (AMR)

As part of the Oxford Thinking Campaign, Richardson continued a fundraising campaign that started in 2004 and culminated in 2019 with £3.3 billion in gifts from more than 170,000 donors. In 2019, Richardson secured a £185 million donation from US billionaire Stephen Schwarzman to fund humanities research at the University of Oxford—the largest single donation since the Renaissance. In 2020, she also secured an £80 million donation from the Reuben Foundation to create Oxford's 39th college, Reuben College, to support applied research.

Richardson opposed Brexit and the United Kingdom's break with the European Union due to concerns over missing out on billions of dollars in EU research funding and collaborations and the agreement's impact on students and staff. In 2022, she said "Twenty years from now, we'll look back and see the results of this gradual erosion of our links with European research."

==== Admissions among underrepresented groups ====
As part of efforts to broaden access to the University of Oxford, Richardson pushed for transparency in admissions.

She committed the university to ensuring that by 2023, 25% of the British students admitted will be from underrepresented backgrounds – compared to 15% as of 2019. Oxford was nearing its goal by the end of 2022 when Richardson said students from the most deprived backgrounds represented 23% of school entrants while the percentage of student from state schools had reached 68%, up from 56% in 2015. Richardson said, "It is a picture of progress on a great many fronts, but with work remaining to be done."

==== Advocacy ====
In October 2020, Richardson announced the launch of the Race Equality Task Force to address the under-representation of racial minorities at all levels within the university. Staff and students were invited to help shape recommendations to address the problem. In March 2021, Richardson announced the establishment of the Oxford Sustainability Fund to make £200 million available for sustainability initiatives over the next fifteen years with the goal of net zero carbon and biodiversity net gain by 2035.

Amid the 2019-20 Hong Kong protests, Richardson was recognized for her leadership and advocacy. Richardson was "admirably robust when threatened by the Chinese embassy with the withdrawal of Chinese students from Oxford unless she stopped its chancellor Chris Patten visiting Hong Kong", and was noted as having "more balls than any male [Vice-Chancellor]".

==== Development of Oxford/AstraZeneca vaccine ====
Starting in early 2020, Oxford took a leading international role in response to the COVID-19 pandemic, prompting a Financial Times profile of Richardson's crisis management style. The article highlighted the vice-chancellor's preference for informality and flexibility and her quick coordination and funding of an emergency research programme led by a group of medical and life sciences professors. "Its best known achievements were the Oxford-AstraZeneca vaccine and the Recovery trial of potential Covid treatments, which together may have saved millions of lives worldwide."

By Spring 2021, the partnership with AstraZeneca had produced more vaccines than any other developer, about a third of the world's 1.47 bn administered doses, and with the widest distribution both geographically and across global income groups. As part of the collaboration, Richardson made distribution of the vaccine as a nonprofit venture a condition of the deal, and as a result, the vaccine will be available at cost in perpetuity in low and middle-income countries. It was distributed at cost in the developed world for the duration of the pandemic. Richardson told the Sunday Times that the vaccine demonstrated the need for long-term thinking when it comes to funding and for "blue-skies research that will have an impact that we can't anticipate now." In a 2023 interview, Richardson said the Oxford-AstraZeneca vaccine was the target of cyber threats and a deliberate misinformation campaign intended to destabilize relations among Western countries.

In February 2022, Times Higher Education summarized Richardson's achievements noting Oxford's COVID-19 vaccine development, charitable fundraising, student access, and an inclination to stand up to "unparalleled media scrutiny."

In October 2022, Times Higher Education released its annual World University Ranking, and Oxford broke a record for the publication's rankings with seven straight years in the top spot, coinciding with Richardson's seven years in the top job. Oxford was followed by Harvard University while the University of Cambridge and Stanford University tied for third place.

==== Higher education strike in United Kingdom ====
In 2018, the trade union representing more than 100,000 staff at universities across the United Kingdom went on strike in a labour dispute that was still underway by the end of the 2022–23 academic year. In late February 2018, the University of Oxford was among the universities whose support for cuts to the national lecturers' pension scheme triggered a 14-day strike. A resolution to revert the decision was spearheaded by six Oxford academics, including Karma Nabulsi and Robert Gildea. On Tuesday, 6 March 2018, Richardson used a technicality to upend a debate on the plans. At a meeting of Congregation, the governing body of Oxford, 20 members and supporters of Richardson stood up as the resolution was introduced, thereby blocking the debate. Academics then held an unofficial vote outside, which delivered a result of 442 for and 2 against. Richardson herself stated that she had been absent from the event due to having "scheduled a trip to New York". An initial offer on her part for a non-binding "town hall discussion" as a replacement for the debate was rejected.

The following day, Richardson sent out an email to staff in which she stated that "In the light of the depth of feeling of so many colleagues, we will convene a special meeting of council today at noon" at which it would be recommended that the university's council "reverse its response to the UUK survey in line with the congregation's resolution".

==== Finances and criticism ====
Richardson's salary was criticised as excessive in 2017 (quoted as £410,000). Richardson was separately criticized for abuse of expenses, including claiming £70,000 in a single year on travel and dining as vice-chancellor. Richardson publicly lists her expenses on the university website. They revealed that her annual expenses totaled about £20,000.

During the COVID-19 pandemic, she received further criticism for retaining her salary while University of Oxford staff were put on furlough on full salary. In June 2022, Richardson announced that all Oxford full-time staff would be given a one-time bonus of £1,000 (US$1240) to recognize their "commitment and dedication" through the pandemic. In November 2022, Richardson announced a one-time payment to staff of at least £800 in response to the cost of living crisis.

==== Criticisms ====
In September 2017, Richardson attracted criticism from students, academics, politicians, and the British press for remarks made in defence of academic freedom that were interpreted by critics as a defence of academics holding anti-gay views towards students. Richardson was previously involved in debates around free speech and around attempts by university students to bar some speakers from campuses. At the University of St. Andrews, Richardson encouraged academics to share their views on the independence referendum and in her first few months at Oxford University she voiced the view that higher education was not meant to be a comfortable experience and that students ought to engage with views they found objectionable. In 2021 Richardson said: "All legal speech should be permitted at a university. When push comes to shove, I would defend any legal speech here however objectionable I find it."

Richardson's comments in June 2020 during the Black Lives Matter protests attracted further public criticism. She suggested that Nelson Mandela would not have wanted the controversial statue of Cecil Rhodes removed, explaining that the South African anti-apartheid leader was a man of "deep nuance" who would have opposed attempts to "hide history." Richardson insisted that views from the past need to be judged in the context of their time with an understanding of why people believed as they did.

=== Carnegie Corporation of New York ===
In November 2021, it was announced that Richardson would become the next president of Carnegie Corporation of New York in January 2023, at the end of her 7-year term as Oxford vice-chancellor. As the philanthropic foundation's 13th president, she oversees one of the United States' leading philanthropic foundations, established in 1911 by Scottish immigrant and American industrialist Andrew Carnegie. Richardson had been on the board of trustees since 2012.

==== Reducing political polarization ====
Under Richardson's leadership, the foundation changed its grantmaking to align with the overarching goals of reducing political polarization in the United States. Funding has supported civic education, socio-economic opportunity, community service and civic engagement, and advancing peace in an evolving world, including nuclear security. In 2023, Richardson announced that the Andrew Carnegie Fellows Program would support polarization research exclusively for three years, an $18 million investment in scholarly research.

==== Libraries and trusted public institutions ====
In 2024, Richardson announced that the foundation will return to it Carnegie library roots by supporting free, public libraries, including the hundreds of libraries constructed by Andrew Carnegie in the 1880s through early 20th century. Richardson told the Chronicle of Philanthropy, "Having a place that is completely nonpartisan, completely unassociated with any political perspective is critically important."

== Research ==
Richardson is the author of What Terrorists Want: Understanding the Enemy, Containing the Threat, an account of terrorism written after the September 11 attacks. Other publications include When Allies Differ: Anglo-American Relations in the Suez and Falkland Crises; The Roots of Terrorism (ed); and Democracy and Counterterrorism: Lessons from the Past (co-edited with Robert Art). She has also published many journal articles, book chapters, and reviews on the subject of terrorism.

Between 2001 and 2008, in addition to her teaching and management roles, Richardson gave over 300 talks and lectures on terrorism and counter-terrorism to educational and private groups as well as policy makers, the military, intelligence, and business communities. She has lectured on the subject of terrorism and counter-terrorism to public, professional, media and education groups across the world. She has testified before the United States Senate and has appeared on CNN, the BBC Desert Island Discs, PBS NewsHour, NPR, Fox and a host of other broadcast outlets. Her work has been featured in numerous international periodicals (Foreign Affairs and Financial Times).

=== Published works ===
- Richardson, Louise (2006). "What Terrorists Want: Understanding the Enemy, Containing the Threat". Random House. ISBN 9780812975444.
- Richardson, Louise, ed. (2006). "The Roots of Terrorism". Routledge. ISBN 9780415954389.
- Richardson, Louise (1996). "When Allies Differ: Anglo-American Relations During the Suez and Falklands Crises". Palgrave Macmillan. ISBN 9781349245048.
- Art, Robert; Richardson, Louise (2007). "Democracy and Counterterrorism". United States Institute of Peace Press. ISBN 9781929223947.

== Awards, honours, and boards ==
=== Awards ===
In 2009 Richardson received the Trinity College Dublin Alumni Award. In 2013 Harvard University awarded Richardson the Graduate School of Arts and Sciences Centennial Medal. In 2016, she received the inaugural Emily Winifred Dickson award from the Royal College of Surgeons in Ireland, which recognises women who have made an outstanding contribution to their field. Richardson's other prizes including Harvard's Sumner Prize in 1989 for her doctoral dissertation on the prevention of war and the establishment of universal peace. Her excellence in teaching undergraduates at Harvard was recognized in 1989 with the Abramson Award. In 2000, she won the Levenson Prize, which is awarded annually by the student body to the best teacher in the college.

Richardson was appointed Dame Commander of the Order of the British Empire (DBE) in the 2022 Birthday Honours for attracting more undergraduates from disadvantaged backgrounds to University of Oxford and to University of St Andrews, and for securing the partnership with AstraZeneca for the production and distribution of the COVID-19 vaccine developed at University of Oxford.

In 2022, the Dame Louise Richardson Chair in Global Security was created at Oxford's Blavatnik School of Government in her honor.

Business & Finance honored Richardson in Ireland with the Sutherland Leadership Award in 2023 in recognition of her contributions to higher education and for her instrumental role in developing the Oxford/AstraZeneca vaccine.

In December 2025, Richardson received the Knight's Order of Arts and Letters from the French Ministry of Culture. In May 2026, Richardson was awarded the Foreign Policy Association Medal in recognition of her work to expand public knowledge of international affairs.

=== Honorary doctorates and fellowships ===
In 2013, Richardson received an honorary doctorate from the Moscow State Institute of International Relations (MGIMO). In 2015 she received honorary doctorates from the University of Aberdeen and Queen's University Belfast. and awarded honorary doctorates by Trinity College Dublin, and the University of St Andrews, and the University of the West Indies. In 2017, Richardson received an honorary doctorate from the University of Edinburgh, and in 2018, she received an honorary degree from the University of Notre Dame and spoke as the primary speaker at the Notre Dame Graduate School Commencement Ceremony. In 2022, Richardson received an honorary doctorate from Ben-Gurion University of the Negev. In 2023, she received a Doctor Honoris Causa from the Université Grenoble Alpes. In 2025, she received an honorary degree from Boston College and was the commencement speaker.

Richardson's honorary fellowships include a senior fellowship to Harvard's Center for European Studies in 2015, an honorary fellowship to Trinity College Dublin in 2016, and an honorary fellowship to both St Hugh's College, Oxford and Reuben College, Oxford in 2022 during her final year as vice chancellor of the university. In May 2026 she received an honorary degree from Hobart and William Smith Colleges and the Elizabeth Blackwell Award in recognition of "her distinguished service to expanding access to higher education and her contributions to the study and understanding of terrorism and foreign policy."

=== Learned societies ===
In 2010 Richardson was elected a Fellow of the Royal Society of Edinburgh (FRSE), In 2016, named an honorary member of the Royal Irish Academy. In 2016 she was also elected to the American Academy of Arts and Sciences, and also named a fellow of the National Academy of Social Sciences. In 2017, Richardson was elected member of the American Philosophical Society.

=== Nonprofit boards and government appointments ===
In 2014, Richardson joined the board of trustees of the Booker Prize Foundation, and in 2019, she joined the board of The Sutton Trust, stepping down in 2024. She joined the board of Inter Mediate in 2024. Richardson has been on the boards of a number of other non-profit groups including the Central European University(2017–21), Carnegie Corporation of New York(2012–2022), and the EastWest Institute (2011–2015). She was on the editorial boards of a number of journals and presses, including the Oxford University Press. Among her roles on advisory boards, in 2023 Richardson accepted positions with the Blavatnik School of Government at University of Oxford and the Weatherhead Center for International Affairs at Harvard University, and the Aurora Prize Selection Committee of the Aurora Humanitarian Initiative.

In 2011 Richardson was appointed to the Scottish Government's Council of Economic Advisers. In 2012, ahead of the centenary in 2014 of the outbreak of World War One, she was appointed to the Scottish Commemorations Panel. In 2023, Richardson was named the independent chair of the Consultative Forum on International Security Policy in Ireland.

==== Consultative Forum on International Security Policy ====
In June 2023, Richardson chaired the Irish Government's Consultative Forum on International Security Policy. Comments by the President of Ireland on Richardson's DBE in an interview with the Business Post, led to President Higgins apologising for any offence caused. The President had criticised the huge number of military personnel involved in the forum, and cautioned against Ireland "drifting" into NATO. The final report, Consultative Forum: Chair's Report consisted of Richardson's analysis of the four days of discussions and over 800 submissions and was delivered to the government in October 2023. In an interview, Richardson said, "Foreign policy and international security are really important but tend to be reserved, as most matters of high politics do, to smaller and smaller groups meeting in closed rooms. So the idea of having a very public debate about Ireland's role in the world, I thought was really quite admirable."

==== Potential 2025 Irish presidential election nomination ====
In August 2025, Fianna Fáil stated that they had considered Richardson as a potential candidate for the 2025 Irish presidential election to succeed the incumbent, President Higgins, with party members believing she "ticks many Mary McAleese boxes."

== Works ==
=== Article ===
- How Philanthropy Can Bring Red and Blue Together by Dame Louise Richardson, The Chronicle of Philanthropy, March 12, 2025

Academic offices
Preceded by Brian Lang	Vice-Chancellor and Principal of the University of St Andrews; 2009–2015	Succeeded by Sally Mapstone
Preceded by Andrew Hamilton	Vice-Chancellor of Oxford University; 2016–2023	Succeeded by Irene Tracey
