= William Peterson (academic) =

Scottish academic (1856–1921)

Sir William Peterson
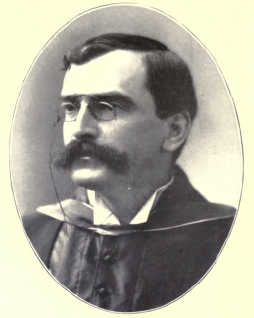
- Born: 29 May 1856; Edinburgh, Scotland
- Died: 4 January 1921 (aged 64); Hampstead Heath, England

Sir William Peterson, KCMG (29 May 1856 – 4 January 1921) was a Scottish academic and the Principal of McGill University from 1895 to 1919.

== Biography ==
Born in Edinburgh, the fifth son of John Peterson and Grace Mountford Anderson, his father was a partner in Peterson Brothers & Co. and lived at Allison Place.

Peterson graduated from the University of Edinburgh in 1875 and Corpus Christi College, Oxford in 1879. In 1882, he became the first principal of the recently established University College, Dundee, a position he would hold until 1895. Peterson, despite being aged only 26, won this position ahead of three other candidates including John Edward Aloysious Stegall, who would go on to serve as Professor of Mathematics and Natural Philosophy at University College, Dundee. Stegall seems to have resented this for he failed to mention Peterson in the lengthy account of the college's early years which he produced fifty years later.

A Latinist and a classical scholar, Peterson, while enjoying academic argument, disliked the politics of academia, particularly the issues arising from the complex relationship between University College and the University of St Andrews.

From 1895 to 1919, he was the Principal of McGill University in Montreal, Canada. Despite being in Canada for almost 25 years he considered himself an exile and always returned to the UK for his summer vacation. He suffered a stroke in Montreal in 1919.

Peterson was appointed a Companion of the Order of St Michael and St George (CMG) during the visit to Canada of TRH the Duke and Duchess of Cornwall and York (later King George V and Queen Mary) in October 1901. In 1915, he was made Knight Commander (KCMG) of the same order.

In 1919, he returned to England and died at Willwood, North End Road, in Hampstead Heath in 1921.

== Family ==
His eldest son, William Gordon Peterson (1886–1930) was also a classicist and moved with his father to Canada. In 1914 he joined the Canadian Expeditionary Force and served as a Major in the Royal Highlanders of Canada winning the Distinguished Service Order in action in France. He wrote a book of his experience called "Silhouettes of Mars". In 1922 he returned to Scotland as a lecturer in classics at St Andrews University. He ran the Officer Training Corps at the university and was found in the gunroom with a gunshot wonud to the head and ied in hospital on 6 October 1930.

His second son, Maurice Peterson, was also a classicist and served in the Diplomatic Service in both Bulgaria and Iraq before becoming ambassador to Spain in 1939 under the Franco regime. Around 1940 he moved to London to serve in the Ministry of Information. In 1944 he became ambassador to Turkey and in 1949 ambassador to the Soviet Union from 1946 to 1949.

Academic offices
Preceded by None (Post created)	Principal of University College Dundee; 1882–1895	Succeeded by John Yule Mackay
Preceded by Sir John William Dawson	Principal of McGill University; 1895–1919	Succeeded by Auckland Geddes, 1st Baron Geddes
