= Brian Lang =

Scottish social anthropologist

Brian Lang CBE FRSE

Principal and vice-chancellor of the University of St Andrews
- In office January 2001 – December 2008
- Chancellor: Sir Kenneth Dover; The Lord Campbell of Pittenweem
- Preceded by: Struther Arnott
- Succeeded by: Dame Louise Richardson

Personal details
- Born: 2 December 1945 (age 80) Edinburgh, Scotland
- Education: Royal High School of Edinburgh
- Alma mater: University of Edinburgh
- Profession: Academic, university administrator

Brian Andrew Lang CBE FRSE (born 2 December 1945) is a Scottish social anthropologist who served as deputy chairman of the British Library and Principal of the University of St Andrews 2001–2008. He was Chair of the Royal Scottish National Orchestra 2008–2015. He is a trustee of National Museums Scotland since 2014.

== Early life ==
Lang was born in Edinburgh and educated at the Royal High School of Edinburgh and the University of Edinburgh where he studied social anthropology, graduating MA in 1968. He started research for a PhD in 1969 with a year of fieldwork in Kenya, and his thesis was accepted six years later.

== Career ==
He lectured in social anthropology for some years at Aarhus University, Denmark. Returning to the United Kingdom, he joined the scientific staff of the Social Science Research Council, where he was latterly Principal Scientific Officer.

In 1979 and 1980 he was head of the Historic Buildings Branch of the Scottish Development Department, and from 1980 to 1987, was Director of the National Heritage Memorial Fund, based in London.

After this, he spent four years as Director of Public Affairs for the National Trust, before his appointment as Chief Executive and Deputy Chairman of the British Library from 1991 until 2000. During this period, the British Library made the delayed and over-budget move into its new building at St Pancras. Lang also instituted a controversial policy of disposing of archives of historic foreign newspapers, which was halted by his successor Lynne Brindley.

Lang is a trustee of the Heritage Lottery Fund, a member of the Cultural Commission. He has chaired the Heritage Lottery Fund committee for Scotland.

=== St Andrews ===
Lang succeeded Struther Arnott as principal and vice-chancellor of the University of St Andrews in January 2001. At his inauguration that year, he stated a commitment to social inclusion. In 2003, analysis of admissions to UK universities from state schools against benchmarks set for each university, found St Andrews performed least well. The following year, Lang announced fifty scholarships for Scottish school pupils intended to tackle elitism by at improving diversity among the student body. While Lang was at St Andrews, the university rose from twentieth in the UK in 2001 to fifth in 2008, according to some league tables.

Lang, upon retirement as principal and vice-chancellor of the University of St Andrews, was succeeded by Louise Richardson. He departed office on 31 December 2008.

=== After St Andrews ===
In August 2008 he was appointed as the chairman of the board of directors of the Royal Scottish National Orchestra and served for seven years until August 2015.

Lang became a trustee of National Museums Scotland in September 2014, with his second term of appointment being extended to March 2023.

=== Controversies ===
During his first year at St Andrews, a member of the university's administrative staff sought compensation after making allegations that Lang had bullied, intimidated and sexually harassed her. Lang denied the claims. Although an employment tribunal hearing was scheduled, the university and former employee reached an out of court settlement in May 2002. In retrospect, the out of court settlement was considered to have contributed to Lang's lack of popularity while Principal.

At an unrelated employment tribunal in 2004, Lang drew on his background in social anthropology to compare an academic department at St Andrews to the Ik tribe of Uganda, who, he said, were noted for their "dishonesty, lying and cheating". (This view of the Ik, due to Colin Turnbull, has been repeatedly criticized.)

Lang was accused of hypocrisy by the St Andrews student newspaper The Saint for promoting the university's environmental policy by asking other members of the university not to use cars, while continuing to use his Jaguar to make the 1.1 mile journey to his office.

== Awards and honours ==
In 2008, Lang was awarded an honorary degree by the University of St Andrews.

Lang was appointed Commander of the Order of the British Empire (CBE) in the 2016 Birthday Honours for services to the arts, heritage, and education.

In 2006, Lang was inducted as a Fellow of the Royal Society of Edinburgh.

Academic offices
| Preceded by Professor Struther Arnott | Vice-Chancellor and Principal of the University of St Andrews; January 2001–December 2008 | Succeeded by Professor Dame Louise Richardson |
