= James McIntosh Patrick =

Scottish painter (1907–1998)

- Born: 4 February 1907; Dundee, Scotland
- Died: 7 April 1998 (aged 91); Dundee, Scotland
- Awards: Guthrie Award, 1935

James McIntosh Patrick, OBE RSA (4 February 1907 – 7 April 1998) was a Scottish painter, celebrated for his finely observed paintings of the Angus landscape and Dundee, Scotland, where he was based for most of his life.

== Life ==
Born in Dundee, the son of Andrew Patrick, an architect and amateur artist who encouraged his son to draw and paint, Patrick studied painting at Glasgow School of Art from 1924 to 1928, studying with Maurice Greiffenhagen, and in Paris. He continued his interest in etching which was very popular in the 1920s and was to prove a source of income for him during the Depression years. A foremost landscape painter, he began his career producing highly finished etchings, but when the market for these collapsed in the 1930s he turned towards painting in watercolour and oil.

Patrick joined the staff of Dundee School of Art in 1929, initially to teach etching and later painting and art history. He continued to teach there for most of the rest of his life, latterly in highly popular non-vocational painting classes on Saturday mornings.

Patrick produced portraits and still life works but is known mainly for his paintings of cultivated landscapes in the Scottish countryside. They are often very wide in scope yet meticulously detailed. In this he has been compared to Bruegel. His style was traditional but his use of colour could be bold, as were some compositional aspects of several of his paintings. In Spring in Eskdale (1935) the scene seems to be viewed from a height, giving an almost aerial view, while in Stobo Kirk (1936) perspective is again deliberately but subtly distorted. Less unconventionally, his landscapes frequently make use of lanes, roads, waterways or other features leading from foreground to middle distance or beyond, drawing the viewer into the picture. This compositional trademark can be seen in one of his earliest landscapes, The Three Sisters, Glencoe (1934), Spring in Eskdale, and many of his later works.

Like many artists of the interwar period, he was profiled as an 'Artist of Note' in The Artist magazine, Vol XIV No 3, in November 1937.

He received many awards including the Guthrie Prize and was elected a full member of the Royal Scottish Academy in 1957. He was appointed OBE in the 1997 Birthday Honours

== Works ==
His works are displayed at such venues as McManus Galleries and Museum, Dundee, Aberdeen Art Gallery, Glasgow Art Gallery, Edinburgh City Art Centre, Manchester Art Gallery, the Walker Art Gallery, the National Gallery of South Africa, National Gallery of South Australia, the Sydney Art Gallery, and the Carnegie Institute (Pittsburgh, Pennsylvania, USA). In 1999 the Patrick family donated his archives to the Scottish National Gallery of Modern Art.

To celebrate its victory in the 1983 University Challenge competition, the University of Dundee commissioned Patrick to produce to two paintings of its campus. Other examples of Patrick's works held as part of the university's fine art collections include portraits of Principal Angus Robertson Fulton and Arthur Alexander Matheson.
