= Consultative Forum on International Security Policy =

National conference hosted by the Irish government in 2023

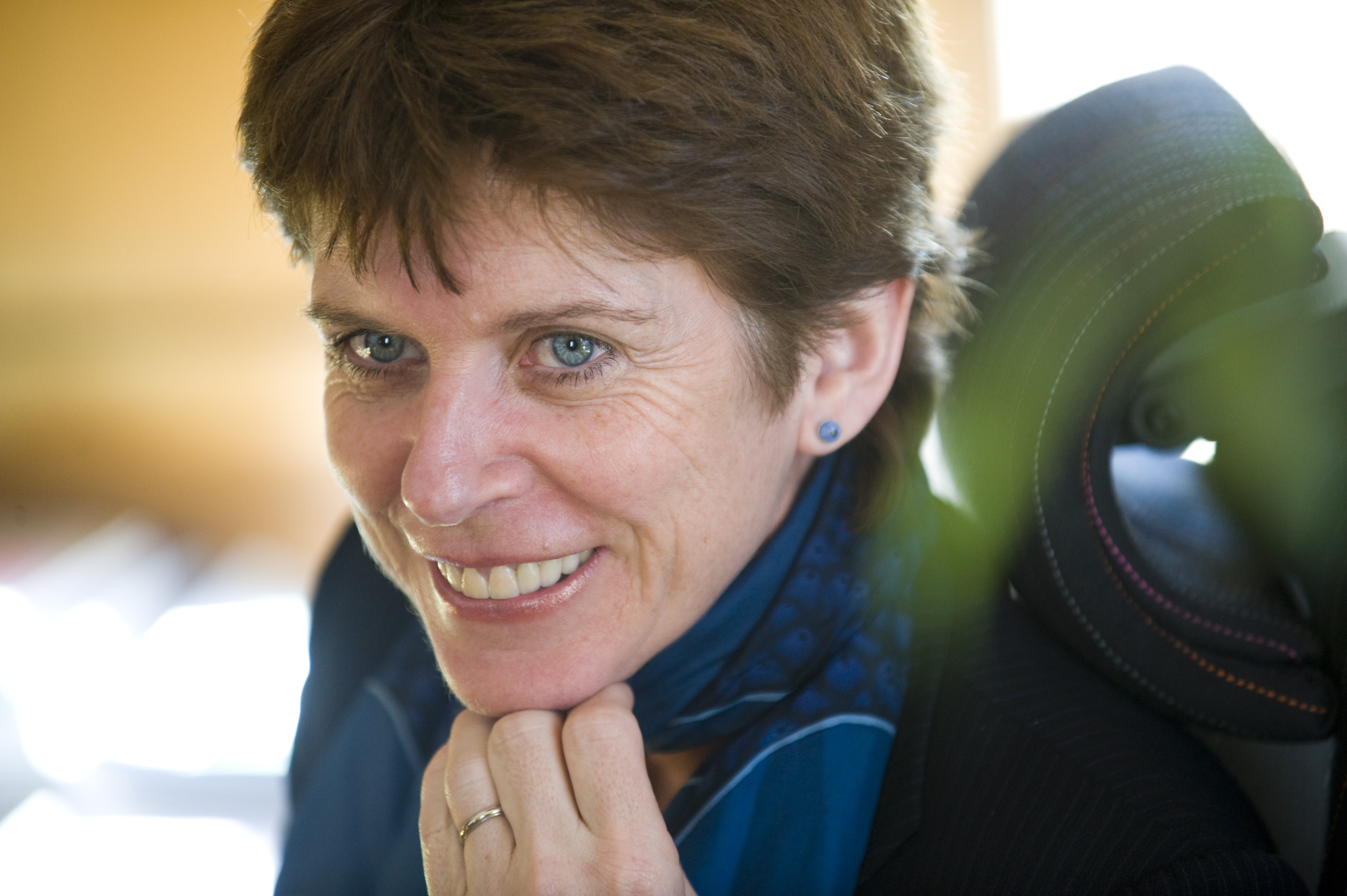
- Louise Richardson DBE, chair of the Forum
- Dates: 22 June 2023
- Ends: 25 June 2023
- Frequency: one-off
- Venue: Cork; Galway; Dublin
- Country: Ireland
- Founder: Department of Defence
- Area: Civil and military defence, security and international relations experts
- Patron: Tánaiste Micheál Martin

The National Consultative Forum on International Security Policy was a public forum convened by the Government of Ireland in meetings in three cities, Cork, Galway and Dublin, to discuss matters of international security including cyber security, the "triple lock", the United Nations and relations with NATO.

== Programme ==
The forum was to discuss various topics, such as cyber security, Irish neutrality, disarmament, humanitarianism peacekeeping and crisis management.

The forum was planned to be hosted in University College Cork, University of Galway and Dublin Castle.

== Speakers and moderators ==
Political scientist Louise Richardson was asked to chair the consultative forum.

- Renata Dwan
- Brigid Laffan
- Neil Melvin
- Réiseal Ní Chéilleachair
- Suzanne Lynch
- Patricia Lewis
- Kate Fearon
- Gary Murphy
- Robert McArdle
- Chris Johnson
- Brigadier-General Sean White
- Caitríona Heinl
- Brendan Flynn
- Robert McCabe
- Christian Bueger
- Shane Ryan
- Edward Burke
- Kieran Brennan
- Ray Murphy
- Declan Power
- Roger Mac Ginty
- Brigadier-General David Dignam
- Michael Beary
- Fiona Nic Dhonnacha
- Roger Cole
- Michael Kennedy
- Conor Gallagher
- Lokesh Joshi
- Rory Montgomery
- Rory Finegan
- Maura O'Sullivan
- Kenneth McDonagh
- James H. Mackey
- Dag Nylander
- Joachim Adler
- Laurent Goetschel
- Matti Pesu
- Magnus Christiansson
- Hanna Ojanen
- Sergey Utkin
- Adam Eberhardt
- Sinéad O'Carroll
- Viktorija Rusinaite
- Art O'Leary
- Michèle Griffin

== Controversy ==
Comments by the President of Ireland on Louise Richardson's DBE in an interview with the Business Post, led to President Higgins apologising for any offence caused. The President had criticised the huge number of military personnel involved in the forum, and cautioned against Ireland "drifting" into NATO.

Opposition politicians criticised the pro-NATO, pro-military nature of the invited participants. Each of the venues were affected by protests.

== See also ==
- Citizens' Assembly (Ireland)
