= Angus Robertson Fulton =

Scottish engineer (1871–1958)

- Born: 1871
- Died: 1958 (aged 86–87)
- Occupations: Engineer, Principal
- Known for: Principal of University College, Dundee

Angus Robertson Fulton MBE (1871–1958) was a Scottish engineer and academic who served as 'Interim' Principal of University College Dundee for seven years.

== Life and career ==
Angus Fulton was born and raised in Dundee. In 1903 he matriculated at University College, Dundee, which was then a part of the University of St Andrews, graduating with BSc.1907 After graduation he joined the college's engineering department as an assistant to Professor Thomas Claxton Fidler. During World War I he served in the Royal Flying Corps, and subsequently in the Royal Air Force, investigating aircraft accidents caused by mechanical problems. In 1920, he became Professor of Engineering and Drawing, a post he held until his retirement in 1946. In 1939 he was appointed as the acting principal of University College, a post he held until 1946. The historian of the University of Dundee, Donald Southgate describes him as modest in character. Michael Shafe's history of the university argues that he was "a good choice for Principal at a difficult moment - he had no enemies, was cheerful and kind and full of commonsense."

== Archives and legacy ==
Some of Professor Fulton's papers are held by Archive Services, University of Dundee. The university's Fulton Building, which houses School of Engineering, Physics and Maths is named for him. Construction on the building began in 1960 and it was opened in 1964.

His sons both followed in their father's footsteps. John Fulton, Baron Fulton was also a university administrator, holding a variety of senior positions in academia. Angus Anderson Fulton was a noted engineer and graduate of University College who served as Dundee Corporation water engineer. His daughter Dr Annie Alexander Fulton (1898-1977) also entered academia. She was an instructor at the Medical School at University College, Dundee from 1926 to 1930 and again from 1944. Dr Annie Fulton also served as Assistant Medical Officer of Health for Kirkcaldy and was an assistant in child welfare in Dundee.

A portrait of Principal Fulton by James McIntosh Patrick is part of the University of Dundee's fine art collections.

Academic offices
Preceded by Sir James Irvine (acting)	Principal of University College Dundee; 1939 – 1946	Succeeded by Douglas Wimberley
