= Struther Arnott =

Scottish academic

Struther Arnott CBE FRS FRSE FIBiol FRSC

Principal and Vice-Chancellor of the University of St Andrews
- In office 1986–1999
- Chancellor: Sir Kenneth Dover
- Preceded by: John Steven Watson
- Succeeded by: Brian Lang

Personal details
- Born: 25 September 1934 Larkhall, Lanarkshire
- Died: 20 April 2013 (aged 78)
- Education: Hamilton Academy; University of Glasgow
- Scientific career
- Fields: Molecular Biology; Cancer
- Workplaces: University of St Andrews; King's College London; Purdue University; University of Oxford

Struther Arnott CBE FRS FRSE FIBiol FRSC (25 September 1934 – 20 April 2013) was a Scottish molecular biologist and chemist who specialised in cancer research. He was a principal and vice-chancellor of the University of St Andrews.

== Education and career ==
Struther Arnott was born in Larkhall, Lanarkshire, and educated at the Hamilton Academy (1945–52) where in 1952 he received the academy's gold medal for general scholarship and silver medal in chemistry and in mathematics, and from which school he won 5th place overall and 1st science place in the University of Glasgow Open Bursary Competition, 1952.

Following graduation (BSc (Chemistry and Mathematics), 1956), followed by PhD (Chemistry), 1960), Struther worked with the Biophysics Unit of King's College London, before his appointment as Professor of Molecular Biology at Purdue University, Indiana. At Purdue he served as head (chairman) of the Department of Biological Sciences, vice-president for Research and dean of the Graduate School. He returned to the United Kingdom to serve as principal and vice-chancellor at St Andrews from 1986 until his retirement in December 1999.

== Awards and honours ==
He held visiting fellowships at the University of Oxford and was a fellow of King's College London. He was elected a Fellow of the Royal Society (FRS) in 1985, and of the Royal Society of Edinburgh in 1988, and was made a Commander of the Order of the British Empire in 1996. He was a member of the Advisory Council of the Campaign for Science and Engineering.

Academic offices
Preceded by Professor John Steven Watson	Vice-Chancellor and Principal of the University of St Andrews; 1986–1999	Succeeded by Dr Brian Lang
