= Principal of the University of St Andrews =

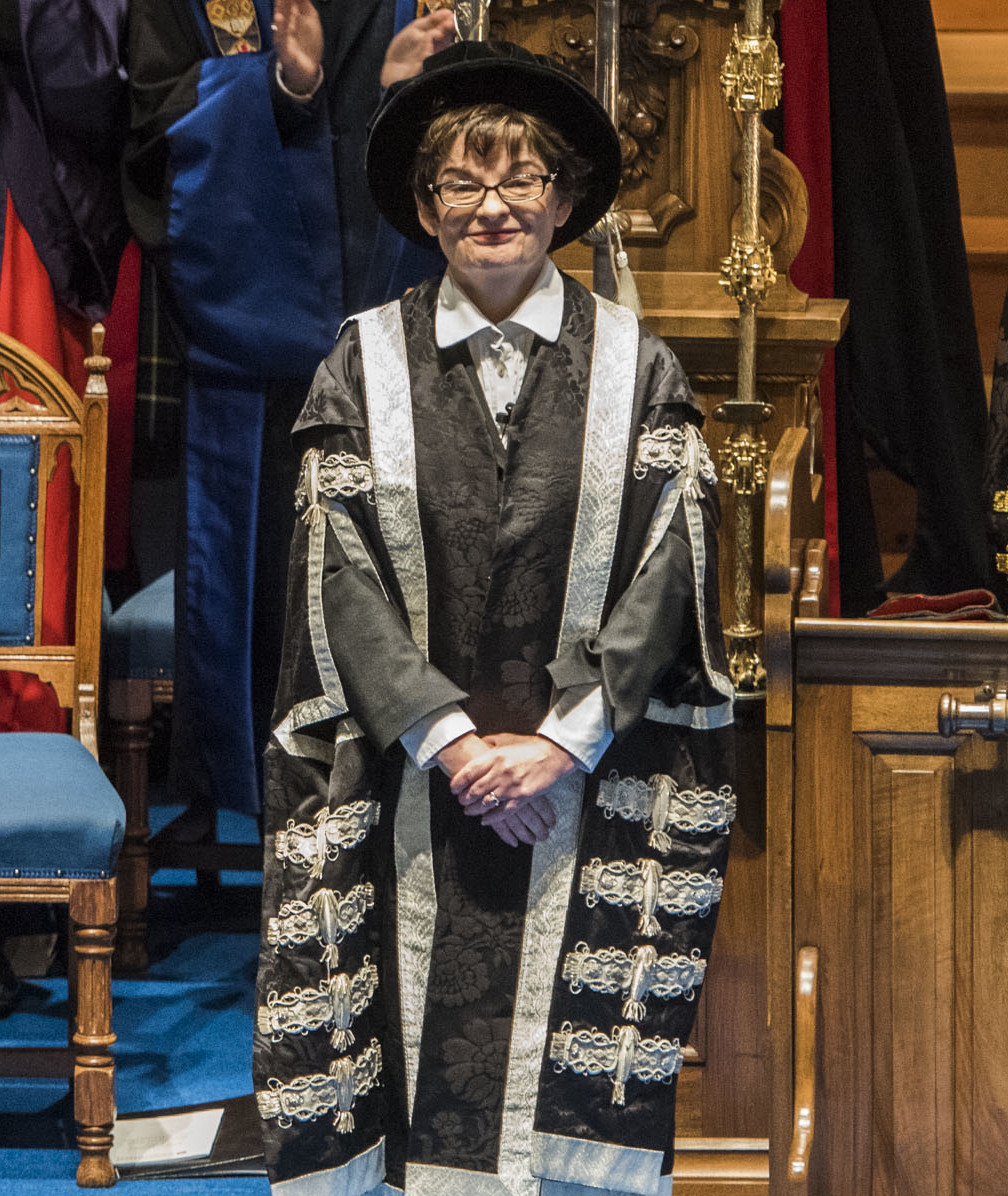
- Incumbent; Professor Dame Sally Mapstone since 17 November 2016
- Member of: General Council; University Court; Senatus Academicus
- Appointer: Appointed by the University Court
- Constituting instrument: Universities (Scotland) Act 1858
- First holder: Sir David Brewster
- Website: www.st-andrews.ac.uk/about/governance/key-officials/principal/

The Principal of the University of St Andrews is the chief executive and chief academic of the University. The Principal is responsible for the overall running of the university, presiding over the main academic body of the university, known as the Senatus Academicus (Academic Senate). The Senate has the responsibility for superintending and regulating teaching in the University, including the regulations for the conferring of degrees, and the Senate also administers the property and revenues of the University (subject to the authority of the University Court.) The Principal is appointed by the University Court. The current office of Principal dates to 1858 with the passage of the Universities (Scotland) Act 1858.

The Principal is, by convention, appointed as Vice-Chancellor of the University of St Andrews by the Chancellor, and can confer degrees in the absence of the Chancellor.

As of July 2023, the Principal was Professor Sally Mapstone, who had previously served as Pro-Vice-Chancellor of the University of Oxford.

== History ==
Until the mid 1700s the University comprised three colleges and the Provosts of St Salvator's College and Principals of St Leonard's College and St Mary's College were responsible for the oversight of their own institutions. In 1747 the Colleges of St Leonard's and St Salvator's were combined into the United College, with the University now led by two principals. The modern office of Principal dates from 1858, with the passage of the University (Scotland) Act 1858. From 1858 until 1889 the senior of the two Principals (of the United College or St Mary's) undertook the responsibilities of Principal of the University, when in 1889 the Principal of the United College was made Principal of the University. The University of St Andrews Act 1952 created the Principal as a separate office, to be appointed by the Monarch of the United Kingdom.

The power to appoint the Principal is vested in the University Court by Schedule 2 of the Universities (Scotland) Act 1966. The Education (Scotland) Act 1981 transferred the power to the Court, with the previous power to appoint the Principal being vested in the Monarch of the United Kingdom. The Principal is also a member of the University Court, as required by Ordinance 121 of the University.

In 2009, Professor Louise Richardson was the first woman appointed as Principal, with her successor, Professor Sally Mapstone being the second woman appointed to the office. Professor Mapstone had previously served as Pro-Vice-Chancellor (Education) at the University of Oxford.

== Vice-Chancellor ==
The Principal is, by convention, appointed as Vice-Chancellor of the University of St Andrews by the Chancellor, and can confer degrees in the absence of the Chancellor. The position of Vice-Chancellor does not confer any other powers or responsibility on the Principal.

== List of Principals and Vice-Chancellors ==
List of presidents
No.	Principal	Term of office	Notes
1	Sir David Brewster	1837–1859	
2	Reverend John Tulloch	1859–1886	
3	Sir James Donaldson	1886–1915	
4	Sir John Herkless	1915–1920	
5	Sir James Irvine	1921–1952	
6	Sir Thomas Malcolm Knox	1953–1966	Oversaw the separation of Queen's College, Dundee from St Andrews.
7	John Steven Watson	1966–1986	
8	Struther Arnott	1986–1999	First Principal at St Andrews to not be appointed by a monarch
9	Brian Lang	2001–2008	
10	Dame Louise Richardson	2009–2015	First woman to occupy the position of Principal at St Andrews as well as the first female Principal to lead an ancient university in Scotland.
11	Dame Sally Mapstone	2016–	

== See also ==
- Ancient university governance in Scotland
- Governance of the University of St Andrews
- Chancellor of the University of St Andrews
- Rector of the University of St Andrews
