= John Steven Watson =

British historian

John Steven Watson FRSE

Principal of the University of St Andrews
- In office 1966–1986
- Chancellor: Douglas Douglas-Hamilton, 14th Duke of Hamilton; Bernard Fergusson, Baron Ballantrae; Sir Kenneth Dover
- Preceded by: Sir Thomas Malcolm Knox
- Succeeded by: Struther Arnott

Personal details
- Born: 20 March 1916
- Died: 12 June 1986 (aged 70)
- Spouse: Heba Sylvia de Cordova Newbery
- Education: Merchant Taylors' School, Northwood
- Alma mater: St John's College, Oxford; Merton College, Oxford
- Profession: Historian

John Steven Watson FRSE (20 March 1916 – 12 June 1986) was an English historian who served as Principal of the University of St Andrews from 1966 to 1986.

== Life ==
He was born on 20 March 1916 the son of George Watson and his wife, Elizabeth Layborn Gall.

He was educated at the Merchant Taylors' School, then studied history at St John's College, Oxford where he graduated MA in 1939. He was a Harmsworth Senior Scholar at Merton College, Oxford, from 1939 to 1942.

After serving at the Ministry of Fuel and Power during the Second World War he returned to Oxford as a postgraduate student and tutor at Christ Church, where he then established an international reputation as an historian of the eighteenth century. This led to him being asked to contribute the volume on The Reign of George III for the Oxford History of England following the death of Richard Pares.

In 1966 he became principal of St Andrews University in Fife, Scotland and served this role successfully for 20 years.

In 1968 he was elected a Fellow of the Royal Society of Edinburgh. His proposers were Anthony Elliot Ritchie, Norman Davidson, Robert Schlapp and Neil Campbell, Lord Balerno. DePauw University awarded him an honorary doctorate (DLitt) in 1967. In 1972 he received a further honorary doctorate in Humane Letters (DHum) from St Andrews.

He announced that he planned to retire in September 1986 but died in June of that year during a visit to London.

== Family ==
In 1942 he married Heba Sylvia de Cordova Newbery. They had two sons: John Philip and Paul Michael.

== Publications ==
- The Oxford History of England (1960)
- The Reign of George III (1960)
- A History of the Salters Company (1963)

== Artistic recognition ==
His portrait by David Donaldson is held by St Andrews University.

Academic offices
Preceded by Sir Thomas Malcolm Knox	Vice-Chancellor and Principal of the University of St Andrews; 1966—1986	Succeeded by Professor Struther Arnott
