= John Yule Mackay =

Scottish anatomist and Academic

- Born: 1860
- Died: 30 March 1930 (aged 69–70)
- Occupations: Anatomist, Principal
- Known for: Principal of University College, Dundee

John Yule Mackay (1860–1930) was a Scottish anatomist and Academic who served as the second Principal of University College Dundee.

== Early life and career ==
Mackay was born in "the manse" of Inverkeithing in Fife on 13 January, 1860, the second son of the Rev. James Mackay.

Mackay started his academic career as a student at the University of Glasgow. In 1881 he graduated with a MB CM and four years later was awarded an MD. He also served as assistant to Professor John Cleland, who held the chair of anatomy. He was then appointed lecturer in embryology at Glasgow, holding that position until 1894. In 1888 a report he wrote on 'The development of the branchial arches in birds’ was published in Philosophical Transactions. According to Michael Shafe, Mackay played a key role in setting up the Student Representative Council at the University of Glasgow by raising funds and negotiating between the University authorities and students. In 1894 he left Glasgow when was appointed Professor of Anatomy at University College, Dundee. He was later awarded an LLD by the University.

== Principal ==
The year after Mackay arrived at Dundee, the College's Principal William Peterson left the College and Mackay was appointed as his successor, an appointment made permanent in 1897. He simultaneously continued to act as Professor of Anatomy until 1925. Nicknamed 'The Chief', Shafe describes him as 'a good administrator with a fine business mind'. Early his term in office, University College became a part of the University of St Andrews after a prolonged battle. In 1896 along with Cleland, his former superior at Glasgow, he produced the works Textbook of Human Anatomy and Dictionary of Dissection. In 1902 he became chairman of General Medical Council’s educational committee. This was followed in 1920 by his appointment as a member of the Scottish Consultative Council on Medical and Allied Services. These additional responsibilities combined with his teaching and administrative duties at Dundee meant he had no time for additional research.

Mackay served as principal throughout the Great War. When the College's War Memorial was unveiled in 1922, he spoke of the College's pride in its students and younger teaching staff who had joined the forces during the conflict, as well as the grief felt for those who had fallen. In October 1924 Mackay delivered a historic public lecture on 'Primitive Man' at University College. This was the inaugural lecture in a series held in partnership with the Dundee Naturalists Society. This series was the start of what would evolve into the University of Dundee's Saturday Evening Lecture Series, which celebrated its 90th anniversary in 2014.

Although in failing health, he remained Principal until 1930, dying shortly after his retirement. Mackay died unmarried on 30 March 1930. His funeral took place in Dundee’s St Enoch’s Church, where he had been an elder, and he was buried in Barnhill Cemetery.

Academic offices
Preceded by William Peterson	Principal of University College Dundee; 1895 – 1930	Succeeded by Sir James Irvine (acting)
