= T. M. Knox =

British philosopher (1900–1980)

Sir Thomas Malcolm Knox FRSE

Principal of the University of St Andrews
- In office 1953–1966
- Preceded by: Sir James Irvine
- Succeeded by: John Steven Watson

Personal details
- Born: 28 November 1900 Birkenhead, Cheshire, England
- Died: 6 April 1980 (aged 79) Crieff, Perthshire, Scotland
- Spouse: Joan Mary Winifred Sumner
- Education: Liverpool Institute; Pembroke College, Oxford
- Profession: Philosopher

Sir Thomas Malcolm Knox FRSE (28 November 1900 – 6 April 1980) was a British philosopher who served as Principal of St Andrews University from 1953 to 1966 and vice-president of the Royal Society of Edinburgh from 1975 to 1978.

== Biography ==
Knox was born in Birkenhead, Cheshire, England, on 28 November 1900, the son of Scottish Congregationalist minister James Knox and his wife Isabella Marshall.

He was educated at Bury Grammar School and the Liverpool Institute, and then at Pembroke College, Oxford where he obtained a first-class degree in Literae Humaniores in 1923. He then worked as secretary to Lord Leverhulme at Lever Brothers before running the business interests of Lever Brothers in West Africa. His first wife died in 1930 and in the following year he became Bursar-Fellow and lecturer in philosophy at Jesus College, Oxford, later becoming a Fellow and Tutor. His interests did not fit in with those then prevailing at Oxford and so he moved to St Andrews University as Professor of Moral Philosophy in 1936, serving also as deputy principal and head of department. He was thus the natural choice as acting principal in 1952 on the death of James Irvine, and was confirmed in position in 1953.

Knox was widely known to philosophers for his translations and commentary of the works of Hegel and for editing the works of R.G. Collingwood. His scholarship was recognised with the award of an Hon. D.Litt. from the University of Glasgow. In 1955 he was elected a Fellow of the Royal Society of Edinburgh. His proposers were David Jack, Edward Thomas Copson, David R. Dow and William Marshall Smart. He served as the Society's Vice President 1975 to 1978.

Whilst Principal of St Andrews, his main task was to reconcile the interests of the section of the university based in St Andrews with those of the section based in Dundee, Queen's College. However, he later concluded that separation of the two could not be avoided and then decided that it would not be proper to continue in his position as his stated policy had changed. In 1967 Queen's College separated from St Andrews to become the University of Dundee. In retirement, he continued to write books, articles and reviews, including translations with commentary upon the writings of Hegel.

Sir Malcolm was critical of the creation of new universities in Scotland in the 1960s, arguing that universities should have medieval roots and have faculties including divinity. While he reserved judgement on the proposed University of Dundee and University of Stirling, he was critical of the transforming of technical colleges into the University of Strathclyde and Heriot-Watt University.

He was knighted by Queen Elizabeth II in 1961.

Some of his papers are held by Archive Services at the University of Dundee. Letters of correspondence between Sir Malcolm and Cordelia James, Baroness James of Rusholme are held by the Archives at the University of St Andrews.

He died at 19 Victoria Terrace, Crieff, Perthshire, on 6 April 1980.

== Family ==
He married three times: firstly to Margaret Normana MacLeod Smith then following her death in 1930 he married Dorothy Ellen Jolly who died in 1974. Finally he married Joan Mary Winifred Sumner, who outlived him.

Academic offices
Preceded by Sir James Irvine	Principal of the University of St Andrews; 1953–1966	Succeeded by John Steven Watson
