= History of the University of St Andrews =

The history of the University of St Andrews began with its foundation in 1410 when a charter of incorporation was bestowed upon the Augustinian priory of St Andrews Cathedral. The University grew in size quite rapidly; St Salvator's College was established in 1450, St Leonard's College in 1511 and St Mary's College in 1537. Some of the college buildings in use today date from this period as does St Salvator's Chapel. At this time much of the teaching was of a religious nature and was conducted by clerics associated with the cathedral.

== Foundation ==
The University of St Andrews owed its origin to a society formed in 1410 by Laurence of Lindores, Abbot of Scone, Richard de Cornell, Archdeacon of Lothian, and the later Bishop of Dunblane, William Stephenson, among others. In 1411 the Bishop of St Andrews, Henry Wardlaw, issued a charter which attracted the most learned men in Scotland as professors. In 1413 Avignon Pope Benedict XIII issued six bulls confirming the charter and constituting the society a university. Lectures took place in various parts of the town until 1430, when Wardlaw allowed the lecturers the use of a building called the Paedagogium, or St Johns, granted by Robert of Montrose to that end. Bishop Kennedy founded and richly endowed St Salvator's College in 1450, the foundation being confirmed by Pope Martin V; seven years later it gained the right to confer degrees in theology and philosophy, and by the end of the century was regarded as a constituent part of the university.

In 1512 Prior John Hepburn and Archbishop Alexander Stewart founded St Leonard's College on the site of the buildings which at one time served as a hospital for pilgrims. In the same year Archbishop Stewart nominally changed the original Paedagogium into a college and annexed to it the parish church of St Michael of Tarvet; but its actual erection into a college did not take place until 1537, when it was dedicated to the Blessed Virgin Mary of the Assumption. The outline of the ancient structure has survived, but various restorations have much altered its general character. It forms two sides of a quadrangle, the library and principal's residence standing on the north and the lecture rooms and the old dining-hall to the west.

At its foundation in 1538 St Mary's was intended to be a College for instruction in Divinity, Law, and Medicine, as well as in Arts, but its career on this extensive scale was short-lived. Under a new foundation and erection, confirmed by Parliament in 1579, it was set apart for the study of Theology only, and it has remained a Divinity College ever since.

== Development ==
During the 17th to 19th centuries, the university underwent many changes. The distinctive red gowns which are still in use today were adopted in 1672 and towards the end of the seventeenth century a move to Perth was considered and eventually rejected. In 1747 St Salvator's and St Leonard's were merged to form the United College of St Salvator and St Leonard. During the nineteenth century student numbers were very low and the university having to close was a very real possibility. In the 1870s there were fewer than 150 students, and perhaps partly in response to this the university was, in 1897, strengthened by the foundation of University College in Dundee which became a centre of medical and scientific excellence.

In 1876, the University Senate decided to allow women to receive an education at St Andrews at a level roughly equivalent to the MA men were able to take at the time (two years before University College London would become the first university in the UK to admit women on equal terms to men). The scheme came to be known as the 'L.L.A. examination' (Lady Literate in Arts), required women to pass five subjects at an ordinary level and one at honours level, and entitled them to hold a diploma from the university. In 1889 the Universities (Scotland) Act made it possible to formally admit women to St Andrews, and from this point onwards, the L.L.A was recognized as a university degree, although not on equal footing to the MA. Agnes Forbes Blackadder became the first woman to graduate from St Andrews on the same level as men of the time in October 1895, gaining her MA, going on to receive an MD from Glasgow University and becoming an eminent dermatologist in London. She entered the university in 1892, making St Andrews the first university in Scotland to admit women undergraduates on the same level as men. In response to the increasing number of female students residing in St Andrews, the first women's hall was built in 1896, and was named University Hall.

== University of Dundee ==
The affiliation of Dundee ended in 1967 when the college, which had been renamed Queen's College, became a separate and independent institution as the University of Dundee - the loss of teaching facilities for clinical medicine caused the University's Bute Medical School to form a new attachment with the University of Manchester. Today the university is growing rapidly and in relatively sound financial health.

Alongside the loss of the main body of the medical school, the independence of Queen's College also resulted in a number of other 'prestige subjects', such as Law and Dentistry, no longer being taught at the university.

== University Library ==
The University library, which now includes the older college libraries, was founded in 1612 at the institution of King James VI, who with other members of the Royal Family donated 228 works for that purpose. It was situated in a purpose-built building on the site of the old Pedagogy, later remodelled in 1764, and improved in 1829 and 1889–1890. The lower hall in the older part of the building was used for university meetings, examinations and academical ceremonials, and at times as a provincial meeting-place for the Scots Parliament. When the constitution of the colleges was remodelled in 1579 St Mary's was set apart for theology; and in 1747 the colleges of St Salvator and St Leonard were formed into the United College. The co-educational St Leonards School now occupies the buildings of the former St Leonard's College.

== Modern Period ==
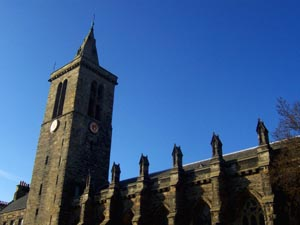
St Salvator's Chapel, by Malcolm McFadyen

The modern buildings, in the Jacobean style, were erected between 1827 and 1847. University College, Dundee, became in 1890 affiliated to the University of St Andrews. The House of Lords set aside this arrangement in 1895, but a re-affiliation took place in 1897. In 1887 - 1888 a common dining-hall for the students was established; in 1892 provision was made within the university for the instruction of women; and for the board and residence of women students a permanent building was opened in 1896. To the south of the library medical buildings, erected by the munificence of the 3rd Marquess of Bute, were opened in 1899. It was during the principalship of Dr James Donaldson, who succeeded John Tulloch (1823–1886), that most of the modern improvements were introduced.

The University retains ownership of the tiny St Leonards college chapel, and candle-lit services take place weekly during term-time. The United College occupies the site of St Salvator's College, but the old buildings have been removed, with the exception of the college chapel, now used as the university chapel, a fine Gothic structure, containing an elaborate tomb of Bishop Kennedy and John Knox's pulpit; the entrance gateway, with a square clock tower (152 feet high); and the janitor's house with some classrooms above.

Since 2006 the university have allowed equal rights to The St Andrews Pagan Society, but under some strict rules.

In 2009 Louise Richardson was installed as principal and vice-chancellor of the university. Not only was she the first woman to hold that position, but she is an Irish-American Catholic. She stated "I don’t believe that talent resides predominantly among males, or among the upper classes". Dr Sally Mapstone succeeded her as principal and vice-chancellor on Richardson's appointment to the University of Oxford.

== See also ==
- Governance of the University of St Andrews
- General Council of the University of St Andrews
