= John Strang =

Scottish minister (1584–1654)

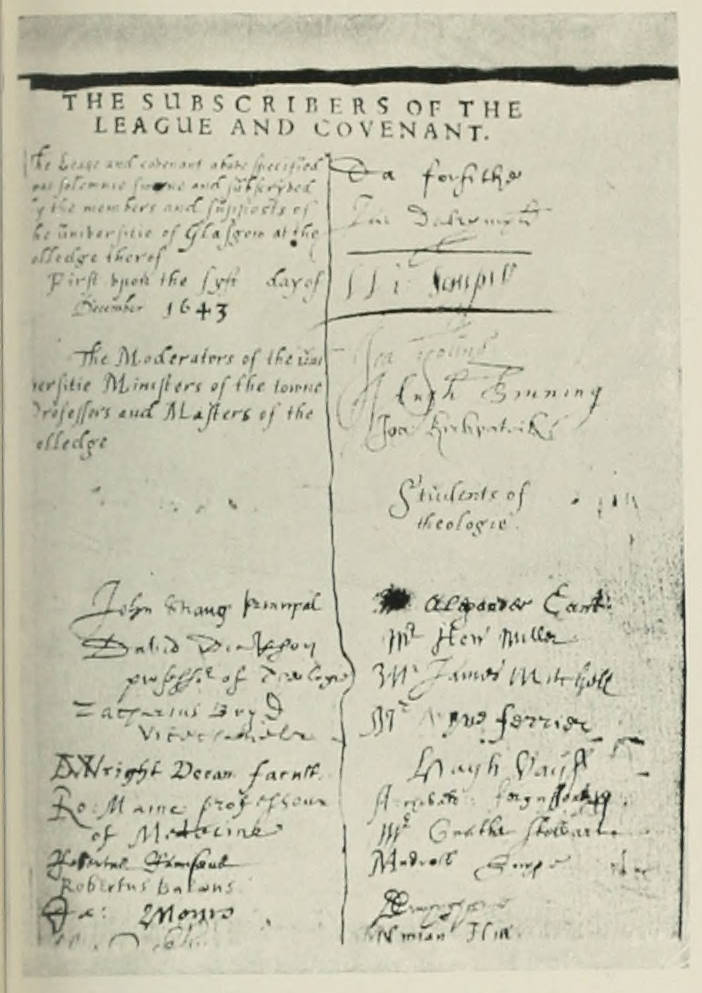
Facsimile of signatures on covenant of 1643

John Strang (1584–1654) was a Scottish minister and Principal of Glasgow University. He was a signator to the National Covenant of 1638.

== Life ==
He was born at Irvine, Ayrshire in 1584. His father, William Strang (1547–1588), minister of Irvine, belonged to the family of Strang of Balcaskie in Fife; and his mother Agnes was sister of Alexander Borthwick, 'portioner' of Nether Lenagher, Midlothian. On William's death in 1588, his mother married Rev Robert Wilkie (d. 1601), minister of Kilmarnock, and young Strang received his early education at the grammar school there, Zachary Boyd being one of his schoolfellows. About the age of twelve he was sent to the University of St. Andrews, and placed under the care of Principal Robert Wilkie, a relative of his stepfather. He graduated M.A. four years afterwards, and subsequently became one of the regents of St. Leonard's College.

He was licensed to preach as a Church of Scotland minister by the Presbytery of St Andrews and in April 1614 he was ordained and on 10 April was inducted to the parish of Errol, Perthshire, being recommended by the professors of St. Andrews and Alexander Henderson, then minister of Leuchars. On 29 July 1616 he was made doctor of divinity by his alma mater, being one of the first on whom that honour was conferred, after its revival, by order of the king; and in the following year, took part in a disputation held in the royal presence at St. Andrews. He was a member of the general assembly held at Perth in 1618, and was the only D.D. who voted against the five articles. On 15 June 1619 he was made a member of the high commission, and in 1620 he refused the offer of an Edinburgh church. During his incumbency at Errol he frequently acted as moderator of the presbytery of Perth in the absence of the bishop, and he was the means of converting several members of the Earl of Errol's family to Protestantism and of strengthening the reformed church in that part of the country. In February 1626 he accepted, after solicitations by the professors and magistrates, the principalship of Glasgow University. In addition to the charge of the business affairs and discipline of the university, he lectured twice a week on divinity, presided at the weekly theological disputations, taught Hebrew, and preached frequently.

When in 1637 the covenanting dispute began, he initially took a middle course. He resisted the imposition of the new liturgy, but, with other Glasgow professors, he disapproved of the national covenant, though he afterwards subscribed it in so far as it was not prejudicial to the royal authority and episcopacy. When the king withdrew the liturgy and canons, Strang wrote a paper giving reasons why those 'who had submitted to the late covenant should thankfully acquiesce in his majesty's late declaration.' Shortly before the Glasgow assembly of 1638 he and others drew up a protest against lay elders sitting in that court or voting in presbyteries at the election of the clerical members; but his supporters backed away, and the covenanting leaders threatened to treat him as an open enemy unless he also withdrew his name. The protest was suppressed. Baillie tells us that his position as principal was greatly jeopardised by his protesting against elders, signing the covenant with limitations, and deserting the assembly after sitting in it several days. Repeated attempts were made to bring his case before the assembly, but they were defeated by the skilful management of Baillie and other friends.

After this Strang submitted to the measures of the Covenanters; but enemies soon accused him of heresy because in his dictates to the students he had expressed opinions as to God's providence about sin which conflicted with the Calvinism of Samuel Rutherford and others of that school. The subject came before the general assembly, and was referred to a committee; after conferring with Strang and examining his dictates, they reported that they were satisfied as to his orthodoxy. This report was given in to the assembly in August 1647, and an act was passed exonerating him from the charge. Soon afterwards the charge of heresy was renewed, and, as the church was now completely dominated by rigid Covenanters, Strang resigned his office. His resignation was accepted by the visitors in April 1650, and they at the same time granted him a pension and gave him a testimonial of orthodoxy. His tenure of office had been marked by additions to the university buildings, to the cost of which he was himself a contributor out of his private means, and the income of the bishopric of Galloway was added to the revenue. In philosophy he had no superior among his contemporaries, and Walter Balcanquhal, in a letter to Laud, pays a high tribute to his learning. Wodrow tells us, however, that 'he had little of a preaching gift.'

He died on 20 June 1654, when on a visit to Edinburgh, and was buried there in the Greyfriars kirkyard. Many Latin epitaphs were composed in his honour, including one by Andrew Ramsay (1574–1659).

== Works ==
The following works which Strang had prepared for the press were published after his death: 1. 'De Voluntate et Actionibus Dei circa Peccatum,' Amsterdam, 1657, which he submitted to the Dutch divines for their opinion. 2. 'De Interpretatione et Perfectione Scripturae, una cum opusculis de Sabbato,' Rotterdam, 1663.

== Family ==
He married:

- (1) Janet (died February 1627), daughter of William Hay of Barra, and widow of James Smyth, minister of Errol, and had issue —
  - Helen (married (1) James Elliot, D.D., minister of Trinity Parish, Edinburgh; (2) Robert Baillie, Principal of University of Glasgow)
  - Elizabeth (married David Fletcher, Bishop of Argyll):
- (2) Agnes Fleming, who died January 1641, and had issue —
  - William, died 1651, aged 22
  - Margaret, (married William Ferguson of Caitloch)
  - Nicolas, buried in Greyfriars Churchyard, Edinburgh, 17 August 1676
  - Agnes
- (3) Anna Stewart, who died June 1649.
