= James Kennedy (bishop) =

Scottish 15th-century bishop of Dunkeld and bishop of St. Andrews

- Bishop of St Andrews
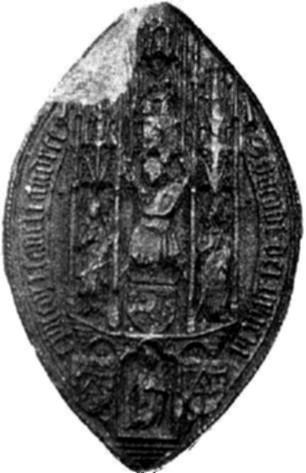
- Church: Roman Catholic Church
- See: Diocese of St Andrews
- In office: 1440 – 1465
- Predecessor: Henry Wardlaw
- Successor: Patrick Graham
- Previous post: Bishop of Dunkeld (1437/1438–1440)

Orders
- Consecration: 1438 (Dunkeld)

Personal details
- Born: c. 1408 Carrick, Scotland
- Died: 24 May 1465 St Andrews, Fife, Scotland

James Kennedy (Scottish Gaelic: Seumas Ceanadach) (c. 1408–1465) was a 15th-century Bishop of Dunkeld and Bishop of St. Andrews, who participated in the Council of Florence and was the last man to govern the diocese of St. Andrews purely as bishop. One of the Gaelic clan of Carrick he became an important figure in the government of the minority of King James III of Scotland as well as founder of St Salvator's College, St Andrews.

He was the third and youngest son of Sir James Kennedy of Dunure, Ayrshire, and Princess Mary of Scotland, widow of the 1st Earl of Angus and second daughter of King Robert III of Scotland. His eldest brother was Gilbert Kennedy, 1st Lord Kennedy. James was born about 1408 and was sent to the continent to complete his studies in canon law and theology.

He was a canon and sub-deacon of Dunkeld until his provision and election to that see on 1 July 1437, after the death of Domhnall MacNeachdainn, the last elected bishop who died on his way to obtain consecration from the Pope Eugenius IV. He received consecration in 1438, the following year.

He set himself to reform abuses, and attended the general council of Florence, in order to obtain authority from Pope Eugenius IV for his contemplated reforms. Eugenius did not encourage him in his schemes, but gave him the presentation to the abbacy of Scone in commendam. Bishop James, however, was not Bishop of Dunkeld for long.

== Bishop of St Andrews ==
The death of Henry Wardlaw left the bishopric of St Andrews, the most prestigious Scottish see, vacant, and it was James who was postulated to the vacancy. This occurred while James was at the court of Pope Eugenius IV, busy at Florence on the historical Council of Florence. However, before royal letters arrived bearing news of James' election, the Pope had already provided his translation to the see. Formal translation took place on 8 June 1440. He was an active and successful bishop. He celebrated his first mass in his St Andrews Cathedral on 30 September 1442, and at once resumed his efforts in reform. During the minority of James III, Kennedy took a leading part in political affairs and was frequently able to reconcile contending noblemen.

He was made Chancellor of Scotland in May 1444 after the expulsion of Sir William Crichton, but resigned the office a few weeks later on finding that his duties interfered with his ecclesiastical work. When the schism in the papacy assumed a very critical character, Kennedy undertook a journey to Rome with the intention of promoting a reconciliation. He obtained a safe-conduct through England from Henry VI, dated 28 May 1446. His efforts were unsuccessful, and he probably soon returned home. Another safe-conduct for himself and others "coming to England", dated 20 May 1455, probably marks the termination of another visit to the continent.

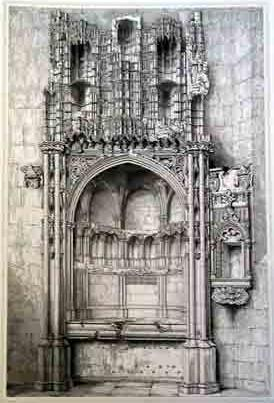
19th-century engraving of Bishop Kennedy's tomb.

In 1450 he founded St Salvator's College in St. Andrews, endowing it liberally with the teinds of four parishes that had formerly belonged to the bishopric. His foundation was confirmed by Pope Nicholas V by a bull dated 27 February 1451, and a few years later some alterations made in the foundation charter received the approval of Pope Pius II by bulls dated 13 September and 21 October 1458. Shortly afterwards Kennedy established the Grey Friars monastery in St Andrews. He also built a large vessel called the "Saint Salvator", which was frequently used by royal personages, and regarded as a marvel, until it was wrecked near Bamburgh while on a voyage to Flanders in 1472. After the death of James II in 1460, Kennedy was chosen one of the seven regents during the minority of James III, and to him was committed not only the charge of the kingdom but the pacification of the nobles associated with him in the government.

== Death and legacy ==
He died on 24 May 1465. The date is usually given as 1466, but a charter belonging to the abbey of Arbroath, dated 13 July 1465, speaks of him as lately deceased, and of his see as vacant. Kennedy was buried in a magnificent tomb which he had caused to be built in St Salvator's Chapel. He had, it is believed, procured the design and materials from Italy. The ruins are still visible.

It is stated by Bishop Lesley that Kennedy's college, ship, and monument each cost an exceptional amount of money. Kennedy was highly esteemed during his lifetime, both as an ecclesiastic and a politician. Even George Buchanan says that he excelled all his predecessors and successors in the see, and praises his zeal for reform. Kennedy is said to have left behind him several treatises. The only titles preserved are Historia sui Temporis and Monita Politica.

== In fiction ==
Bishop Kennedy is a significant character in Black Douglas by Nigel Tranter, where he is depicted rather unfavourably.

== Arms ==
Coat of arms of James Kennedy
Notes Kennedy's was founder of St Salvator's College. His arms were adopted by the latter and later also by St Salvator's Hall. Escutcheon Argent, a chevron gules, between three crosscrosslets fitchée sable, within a double tressure flory-counter-flory of the second.

== DNB sources ==
This article incorporates text from the Dictionary of National Biography, 1891. It cites the following sources:

- Reg. Mag. Sig. Scot., 1424–1513
- Cal. Documents relating to Scotland, vol. IV.
- Thomas Rymer's Fœdera
- Keith's Scottish Bishops

== Sources ==
Many details in the 1891 DNB article are inaccurate, esp. dates, and some have been corrected from the following sources:

- Dowden, John, The Bishops of Scotland, ed. J. Maitland Thomson, (Glasgow, 1912)
- Watt, D.E.R., Fasti Ecclesiae Scotinanae Medii Aevi ad annum 1638, 2nd Draft, (St Andrews, 1969)

Attribution

This article incorporates text from a publication now in the public domain: "Kennedy, James (1406?-1465)". Dictionary of National Biography. London: Smith, Elder & Co. 1885–1900.

Religious titles
Preceded by Robert de Cardeny (consecrated); Domhnall MacNeachdainn (unconsecrated)	Bishop of Dunkeld; 1437/8–1440	Succeeded by Alexander de Lawedre (unconsecrated); James Bruce (consecrated)
Preceded by Henry Wardlaw	Bishop of St Andrews (Cill Rìmhinn); 1440–1465	Succeeded by Patrick Graham (after 1472, Archbishop)
Academic offices
Preceded by Henry Wardlaw; Bishop of St Andrews	Chancellor of the University of St Andrews; 1440–1465	Succeeded by Patrick Graham; Bishop of St Andrews
