= John Herkless =

Scottish biographer and educator

Sir John Herkless
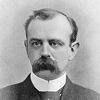
- Sir John Herkless, circa 1911

Principal of the University of St Andrews
- In office 1915–1920
- Preceded by: Sir James Donaldson
- Succeeded by: Sir James Irvine

Personal details
- Born: 9 August 1855 Glasgow, Scotland
- Died: 11 June 1920 (aged 64) Dundee, Scotland
- Education: High School of Glasgow
- Alma mater: University of Glasgow
- Profession: Writer, biographer, minister and lecturer

Sir John Herkless (9 August 1855 – 11 June 1920) was a Scottish biographer and educator who was Principal and Vice Chancellor of the University of St Andrews and Principal of United College of St Salvator and St Leonard from 1915 to 1920. He was knighted in 1917 and was the author of several books mainly of an ecclesiastical nature.

He was born in Glasgow in 1855, the son of William Herkless, an engineer and Janet Robertson. He was educated in the High School of Glasgow before entering Glasgow University. He did not distinguish himself as a student and he left without a degree. However, he studied the arts and attended medical classes. Although he disliked mathematics, he was fond of philosophy. He then studied for the ministry and was duly licensed as a minister. He lectured on English Literature at Queen Margaret College, Glasgow, before becoming an assistant minister. This lasted till 1883 when he was appointed as minister to the parish of Tannadice in Angus. Herkless also held the post of Professor of Ecclesiastical History at the University of St Andrews.

During his career he wrote several books including: The Archbishops of St Andrews which he co-wrote with Robert Hannay and Francis and Dominic and the Mendicant Orders. His chief recreation was golf and he was a member of The Royal and Ancient Golf Club of St Andrews. He died in Dundee on 11 June 1920.

== His career ==
- 1881-1883 - Tutor in English Literature, Queen Margaret College (Glasgow);
- 1881-1883 - Assistant Minister, St Matthew’s Parish Church, Glasgow;
- 1883-1884 - Minister of the parish of Tannadice in Angus;
- 1894-1915 - Regius Professor of Ecclesiastical history, St Andrews University;
- 1911-1915 - Provost of St Andrews;
- 1913-1915 - Chairman of Fife County Insurance Committee;
- 1915-1920 - Principal and Vice Chancellor of University of St. Andrews

== Publications ==
- Cardinal Beaton, Priest and Politician, London: William Blackwood & Sons, 1891.
- Richard Cameron, Edinburgh: Oliphant, Anderson and Ferrier, May 1896, ("Famous Scots Series").
- Francis and Dominic and the Mendicant Orders, Edinburgh: T. & T. Clark, 1901.
- The Early Christian Martyrs and their Persecutions, London: J. M. Dent, 1904, (Temple series of Bible handbooks).
- The College of St. Leonard: Being documents with translations, notes, and historical introductions, Prepared and edited by J. Herkless and R. K. Hannay, Edinburgh & London: William Blackwood & Sons, 1905.
- The Archbishops of St. Andrews, Edinburgh & London, William Blackwood & Sons, 1907.

Academic offices
Preceded by Sir James Donaldson	Principal of the University of St Andrews; 1915–1920	Succeeded by Sir James Irvine
