= Donald McNaughton =

Donald McNaughton may refer to:

- Donald McNaughton (Canadian general) (born 1934), Canadian general
- Donald McNaughton (New York politician) (1830–1893), American politician
- Domhnall MacNeachdainn (died 1440), dean and bishop
