= Joseph McCormick (minister) =

Scottish clergyman

Joseph McCormick FRSE FSA (1733–1799) was a Scottish clergyman who served as Moderator of the General Assembly of the Church of Scotland in 1782 and was a joint founder of the Royal Society of Edinburgh in 1783.

== Life ==
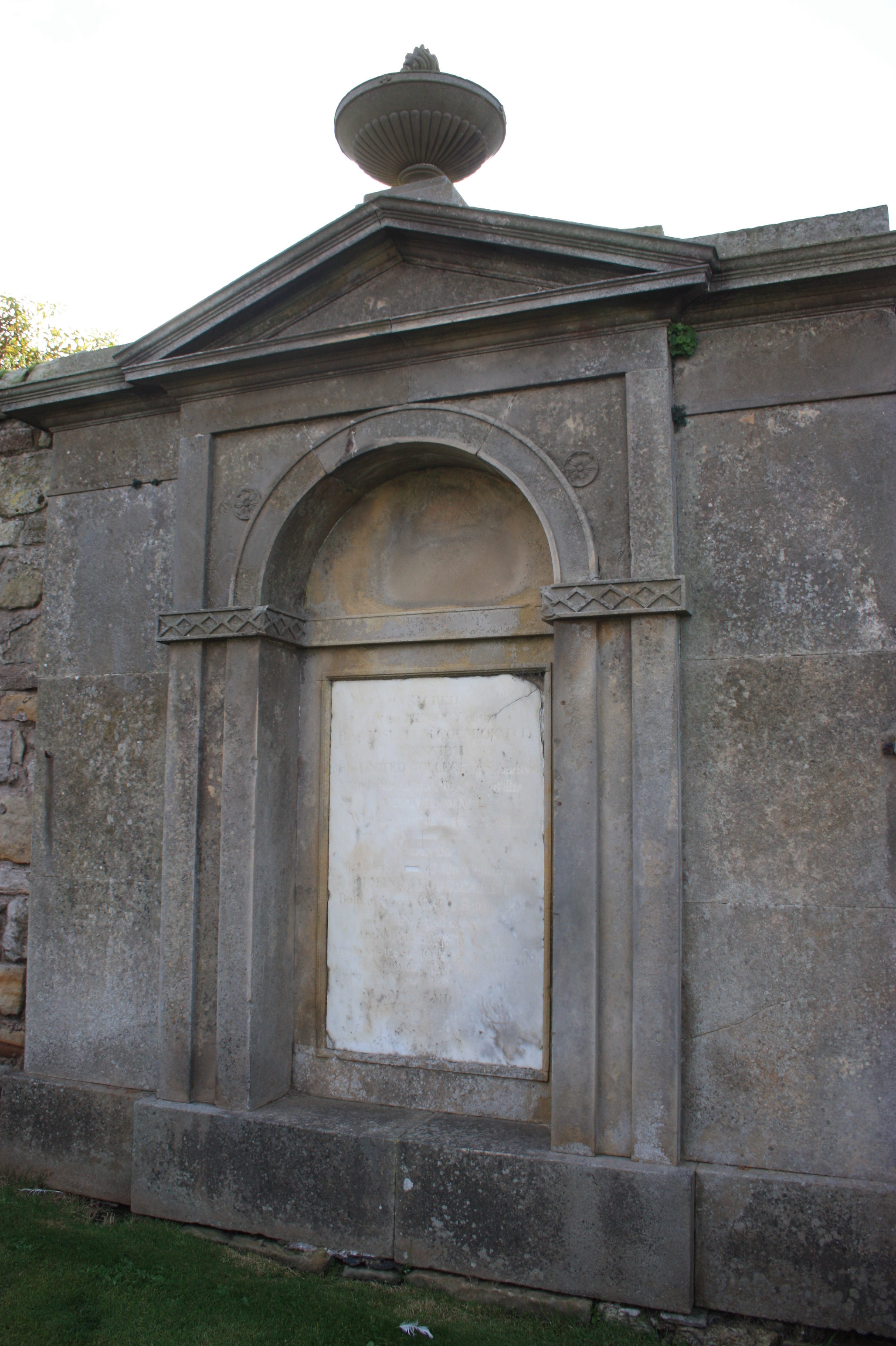
The grave of Very Rev Joseph McCormick, St Andrews Cathedral graveyard

He was born in St Andrews on 22 January 1733, one of six children to Rev John McCormick, a local minister, and his wife, Anna Drew.

He studied divinity at St Andrews University and graduated MA in 1750. He was licensed to preach as a Church of Scotland minister by the Presbytery of Edinburgh in 1757, but was not ordained until April 1760 when he became minister of Kilmany, but only stayed a few months before translating to Temple, Midlothian. In 1771 he moved to Prestonpans and remained there until 1781.

From July 1781 he served as Principal of the combined colleges of St Salvators and St Leonards at St Andrews University. He was elected Moderator of the General Assembly in 1782.

From 1788 he also served as Dean of the Chapel Royal in Scotland.

He died on 17 June 1799. He is buried in the graveyard of St Andrews Cathedral. The grave lies on the wall to the west of the central tower.

== Family ==
In May 1770 he married Mary Simson daughter of Joseph Simson of Bristol. They had six children.

As a widow Mary retired to the manse in Kilconquhar in Fife to live with her daughter Elizabeth and her husband Rev Dr William Ferris the local minister and died there in 1822.
