= John Young (bishop of Argyll) =

Bishop of Argyll and Minister of Church of Scotland

John Young (1624–1665) was a minister of the Church of Scotland who was elected Bishop of Argyll.

== Life ==
He was born in 1624 in western Scotland. Little is known of Young but he was elected Professor of Divinity in place of Rev Robert Baillie in October 1652 and took on the role in November. He was created Dean of Faculty in June 1653. In 1665 he was elected Bishop of Argyll in place of David Fletcher but died before his consecration.

== Family ==
He married twice: firstly Barbara Roberton, secondly (around 1660) Marion Campbell (1637-1669) daughter of Colin Campbell of Blythswood.
