= St Salvator's Hall =

Residence hall at the University of St Andrews

- University of St Andrews
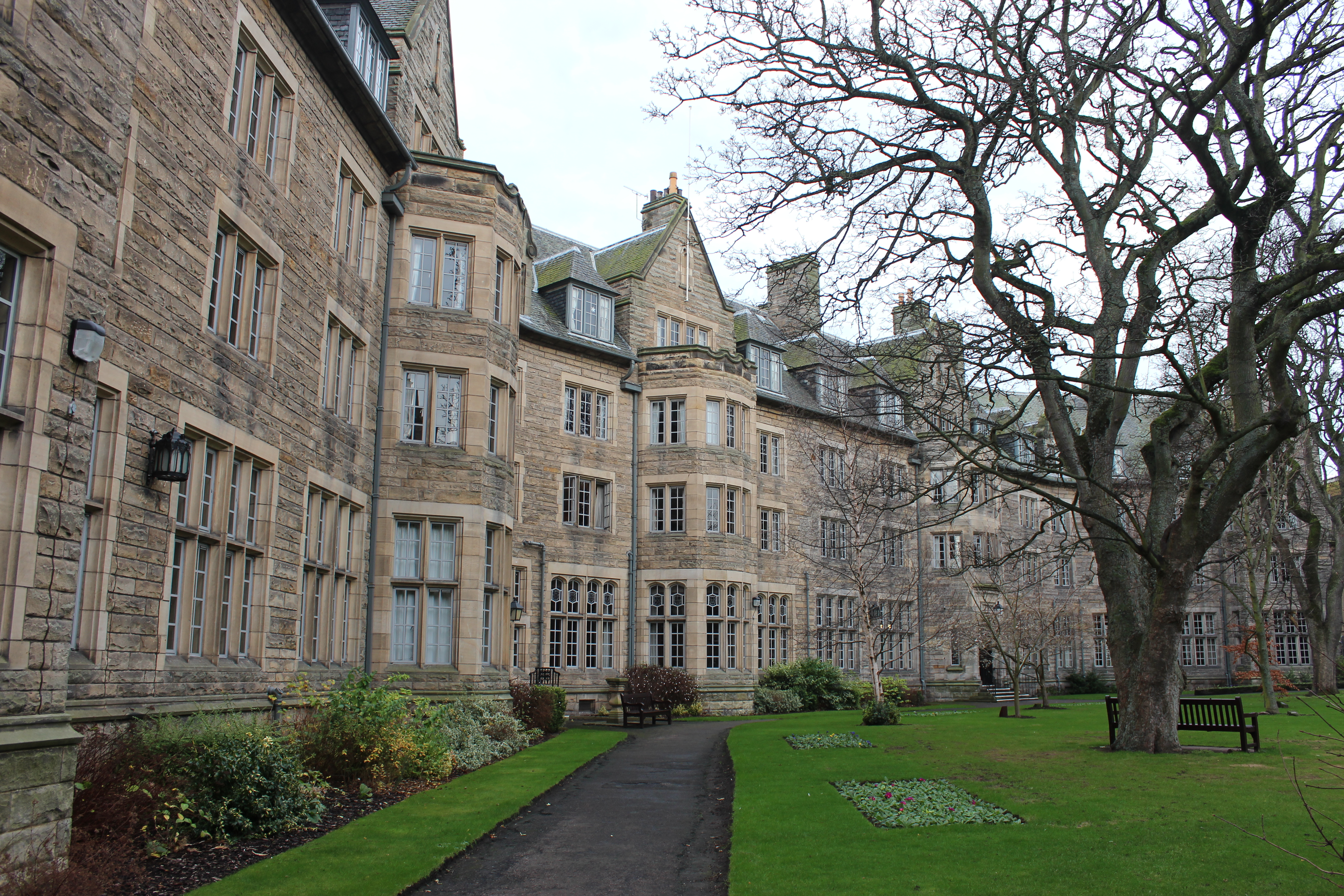
- The main building seen from the front lawn

- St. Salvator's Hall heraldic shield
- Location: St Andrews, Fife, Scotland
- Campus quad: United College Quadrangle
- Coordinates: 56.3419°N 2.7921°W
- Established: 1930
- Architect: J. Donald Mills
- Architectural style: English Domestic Gothic
- Gender: Mixed
- Residents: 191
- Called: Sallies
- Website: https://st-salvators.weebly.com/home.html

Map
- Location within Fife

St Salvator's Hall (affectionately known as Sallies) is a student hall of residence at the University of St Andrews. It lies close to the quadrangle of the United College, St Andrews and St Salvator's Chapel, a foundation which was endowed by King James II of Scotland. The Hall is in an area between North Street and The Scores. Architecturally, it has been described as a "rambling Gothic dormitory".

The stained glass windows of the hall and the paintings in its oak-panelled dining room feature associates and benefactors of the University of St Andrews, such as David Beaton, James Graham, 1st Marquess of Montrose and Edward Harkness. The hall has had a history of health disasters. These include an incident of mass poisoning with arsenic trioxide in January 1945 and the contamination of the hall's water supply with Legionella bacteria in November 2020.

== History ==
Edward Harkness, benefactor.

In the 1920s, the vice-chancellor of the University of St Andrews, Sir James Irvine made plans to extend university buildings and St Salvator's Hall was one of the first outcomes of this vision. The hall, originally a male-only residence, was built between 1930 and 1933, funded by the American Philanthropist, Edward Harkness and modelled on Oxbridge colleges. The architects were Mills & Shepherd who had previously built University Hall. It was extended between 1937 and 1939 to the cost of £40,000, and underwent a £1.7 million refurbishment in 1994. Since 1971 the building and its sundial have been listed as Grade B by Historic Scotland. The stained glass windows, designed by William Wilson, and paintings in its oak-panelled dining room feature associates and benefactors of the University of St Andrews such as David Beaton, James Graham, 1st Marquess of Montrose and Edward Harkness.

On 15 January 1945, students at the hall became ill after consuming sausages from a local butcher that turned out to be contaminated with arsenic trioxide. Most of those who ate them experienced symptoms such as stomach pains, diarrhoea and vomiting. The origin of the contamination was never established.

In November 2020, during a routine inspection, Legionella bacteria was found in the water supply for the hall. This prompted temporary shower facilities to be set up and students to be provided with bottled water.

== Facilities ==
There are 65 single rooms and 63 shared rooms. In total it houses 196 students. As well as several rooms downstairs the hall has three floors: A, B and C; and a further wing known as D block which was the former servants quarters. Until recently residents of D block were unable to access the main building without going outside, however, a hallway extension was recently built, allowing interior access. Downstairs there is an oak-panelled Common Room with a Grand Piano and a television provided for the use of students. It is filled with photographs of students from the 1930s to the present day. St Salvator's Hall has its own annexe, Gannochy House, which, until 2014, housed only postgraduates; it is no longer home to postgraduates but rather 85 undergraduate students who dine and use communal spaces in the main building of St Salvator's. Gannochy House received its name from the Gannochy Trust which helped to fund its construction. The annexe is fitted with kitchens, a study room, laundry facilities and its own courtyard.

At the west wing of the building there is a small library and a study room. A computer room with pigeon holes for residents' post is also situated on the ground floor. In the west basement there is a snooker table, table tennis, an overhead projector and laundry facilities. It is the setting for movie nights organised by the Hall Committee. The basement was refurbished in the summer of 2009, aided by a bequest.

The student bedrooms are spread on three floors above. In the early years each bedroom was provided with a fireplace but now they come with a desk, a wardrobe (sometimes built-in), a bookcase and a wash hand basin. There are pantries and bathrooms on each floor. Each room has views of either St Andrews Bay or the edge of the United College Quadrangle and the front lawn. The D-Block extension houses some students and is connected to the main building by a corridor.

Students are catered for 19 meals during the week; all except weekend dinners. Two courses are offered at lunchtime and three courses at dinner.

The Hall Committee meets weekly in the Regents Room. The Hall Committee are responsible for hosting weekly events for residents from themed ceilidhs to pub quizzes and whisky tasting. In addition to this, four members of the Hall Committee form the executive committee who work closely with the residence managers and Wardennial Team. There are an additional four Assistant Wardens who are available each evening for residents to contact.

It is used as a conference venue and as accommodation for residential camps during the summer.

== Reputation and traditions ==
St Salvator's Hall is acknowledged by students to be one of the most prestigious residences for undergraduates in St Andrews and one with its own distinct traditions. A 1965 guide book described it as "one of the finest students' residences in Britain".

=== Formal Dinners ===
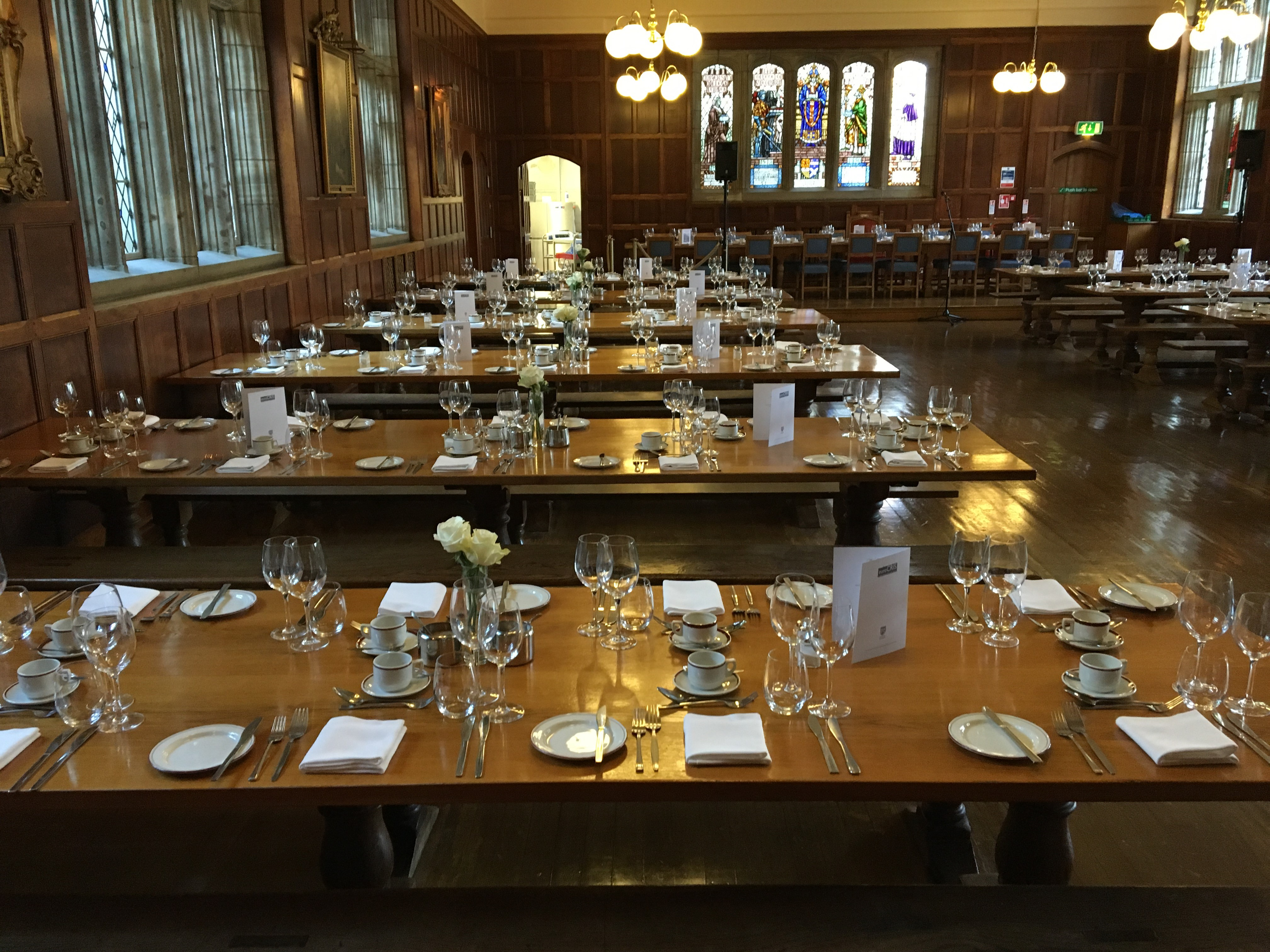
The main dining hall set for a formal dinner

A High Table takes place on Thursdays during term time; in which resident guests sit with the Senior Student, members of the Wardennial Team and a guest (usually an academic) from outside of the hall; preceding the three-course meal is a sherry reception and following the meal is an evening of port, tea, coffee and a talk by the guest, both held in the Regents' Room. At each dinner students dress formally and wear their undergraduate gowns. Latin grace is said by the Warden and all hall residents stand as those on the High Table enter the dining hall. For the Christmas formal dinner all of the Hall Committee sit on the High Table then champagne and Christmas carols are enjoyed in the Common Room by all the students. At the end of the academic year a High Table dinner for graduating students (Valedictorians) is held.

=== Annual Events ===
Freshers' Week is organised by the hall committee and includes several events designed to integrate new students into life at the university. The ball is held at the beginning of the second semester and is organised by the Ball Conveners on the Hall Committee. Before final exams "Sallies Day" is celebrated on the front lawn where students picnic and drink Pimm's. The hall is well positioned for the annual May Dip and May Ball.

== Notable people associated with St Salvator's Hall ==
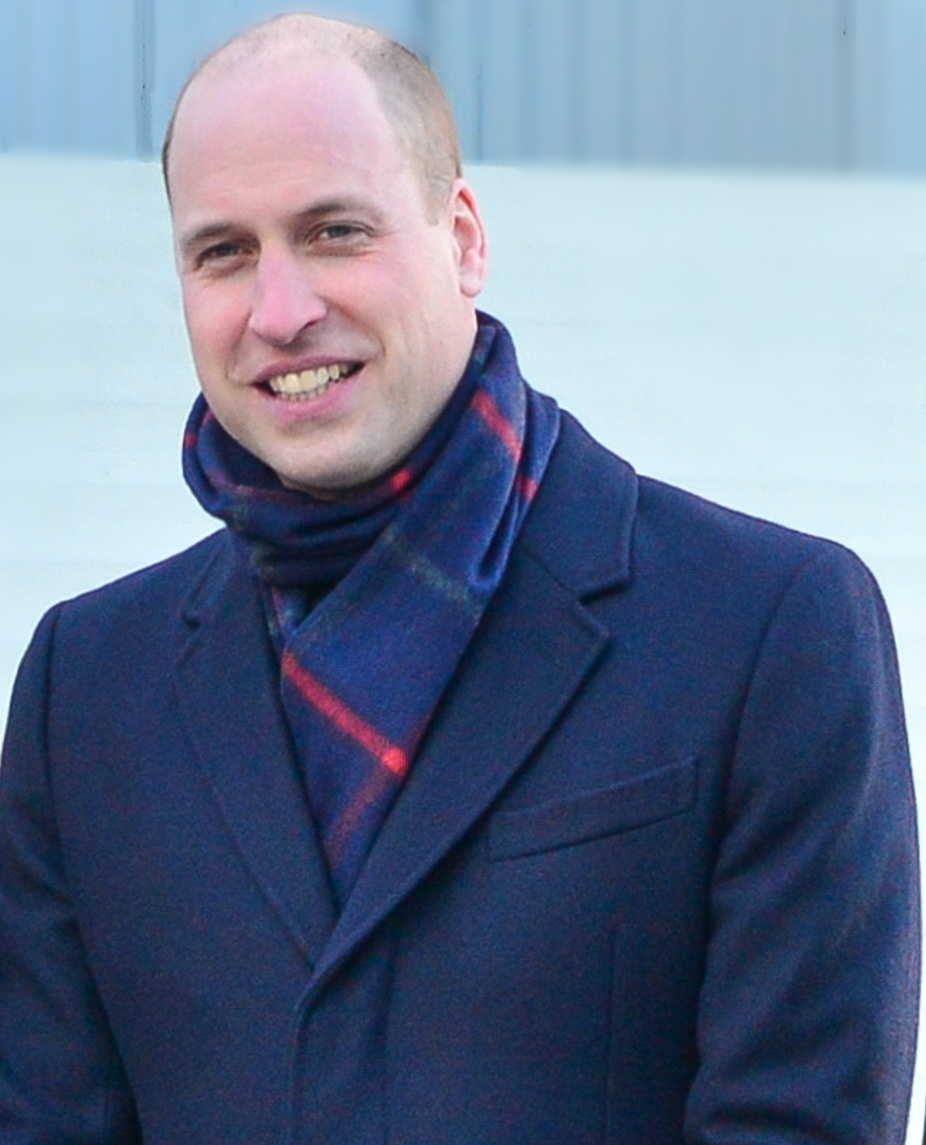
William, Prince of Wales

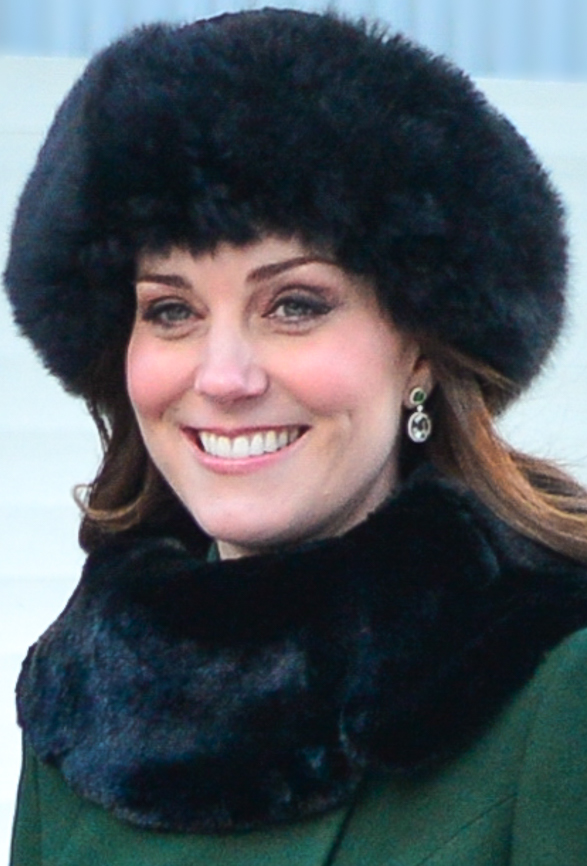
Catherine, Princess of Wales

- Walter Ledermann, a respected mathematician who died on 22 May 2009 lived in the hall as an undergraduate. He came on a scholarship designed by the university to help those persecuted in Nazi Germany.
- In 1945, Sir D'arcy Wentworth Thompson, winner of the Darwin Medal was in the hall at a dinner held in his honour. During the Second World War when a whale had been washed ashore, he took a cleaver from the hall kitchen, went down to the bay and cut a large steak from it which was enjoyed by the students that evening.
- Sir James W. Black, recipient of the Nobel Prize for Medicine in 1988, lived in St Salvator's Hall during his undergraduate years.
- The mascot of the University of St Andrews Charities Committee, Rory McLion was "born in the basement of St Salvator's Hall in October 1977"
- The Prince and Princess of Wales (then Prince William and Catherine Middleton) both lived in St Salvator's Hall during their first year at the university.
