= Robert Sinclair (bishop) =

Robert Sinclair († 1398) was a late 14th century bishop of Orkney and bishop of Dunkeld.

== Biography ==
Before becoming a bishop, he was Dean of Moray and had obtained a Bachelor's degree in Law. By 28 November 1383 he is being spoken of in the documents of Avignon Pope Clement VII as bishop-elect of Orkney, and was probably fully appointed by 27 January 1384. On 1 February 1391 he was translated to the more prestigious bishopric of Dunkeld. Within a few years of his translation to Dunkeld, Robert found himself involved in a serious dispute with William Blackburn, the abbot of Cambuskenneth. The details of this dispute are not entirely known, but on 25 March 1393 he was excommunicated by a papal judge-delegate. Intervention by King Robert III probably gained him absolution within the following few year or so. On 18 January 1395 he visited Cambuskenneth Abbey with a retinue of 56 horses, and was entertained there, an event which certainly points to some kind of reconciliation. Robert was dead by November 1398.

Religious titles
Preceded by William	Bishop of Orkney; Avignon candidate Opposed by John of Pentlar; 1382/4–1391	Succeeded by Alexander Vaus (unconsecrated); William Stephani
Preceded by John de Peblys	Bishop of Dunkeld; 1391–1398	Succeeded by Robert de Cardeny
