= St Salvator's College, St Andrews =

College of the University of St Andrews

Coordinates: 56.341424°N 2.794658°W

St Salvator's College
- Coat of arms of St Salvator's College
- Former names: The College of the Holy Saviour
- Type: College
- Active: 1450–1747
- Affiliations: University of St Andrews
- Location: St Andrews, Fife, Scotland

St Salvator's College was a college of the University of St Andrews in St Andrews, Scotland. Founded in 1450, it is the oldest of the university's colleges. In 1747 it merged with St Leonard's College to form United College.

== History ==
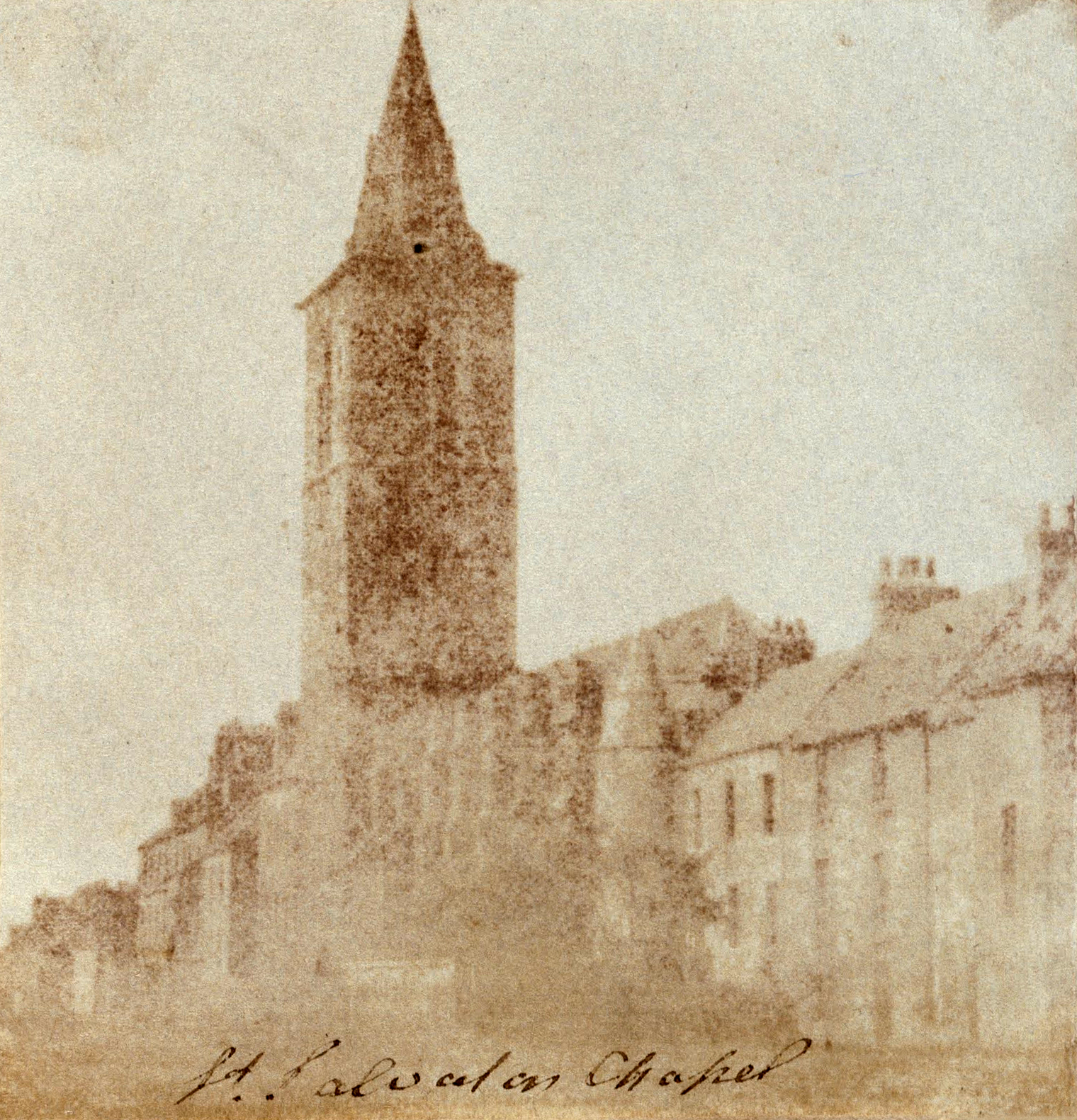
St. Salvator's College in 1843

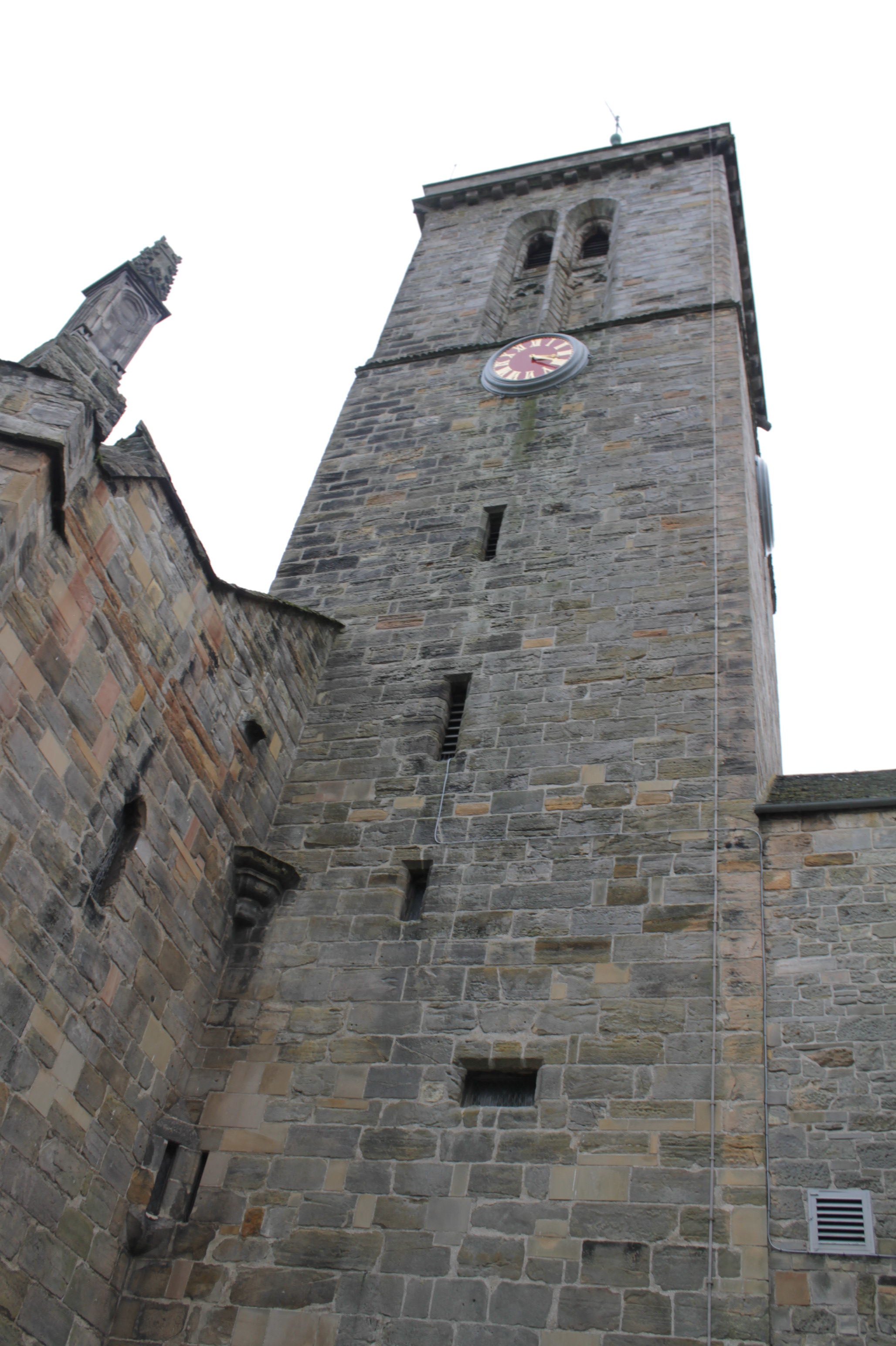
West Tower, St Salvator's College, St Andrews University

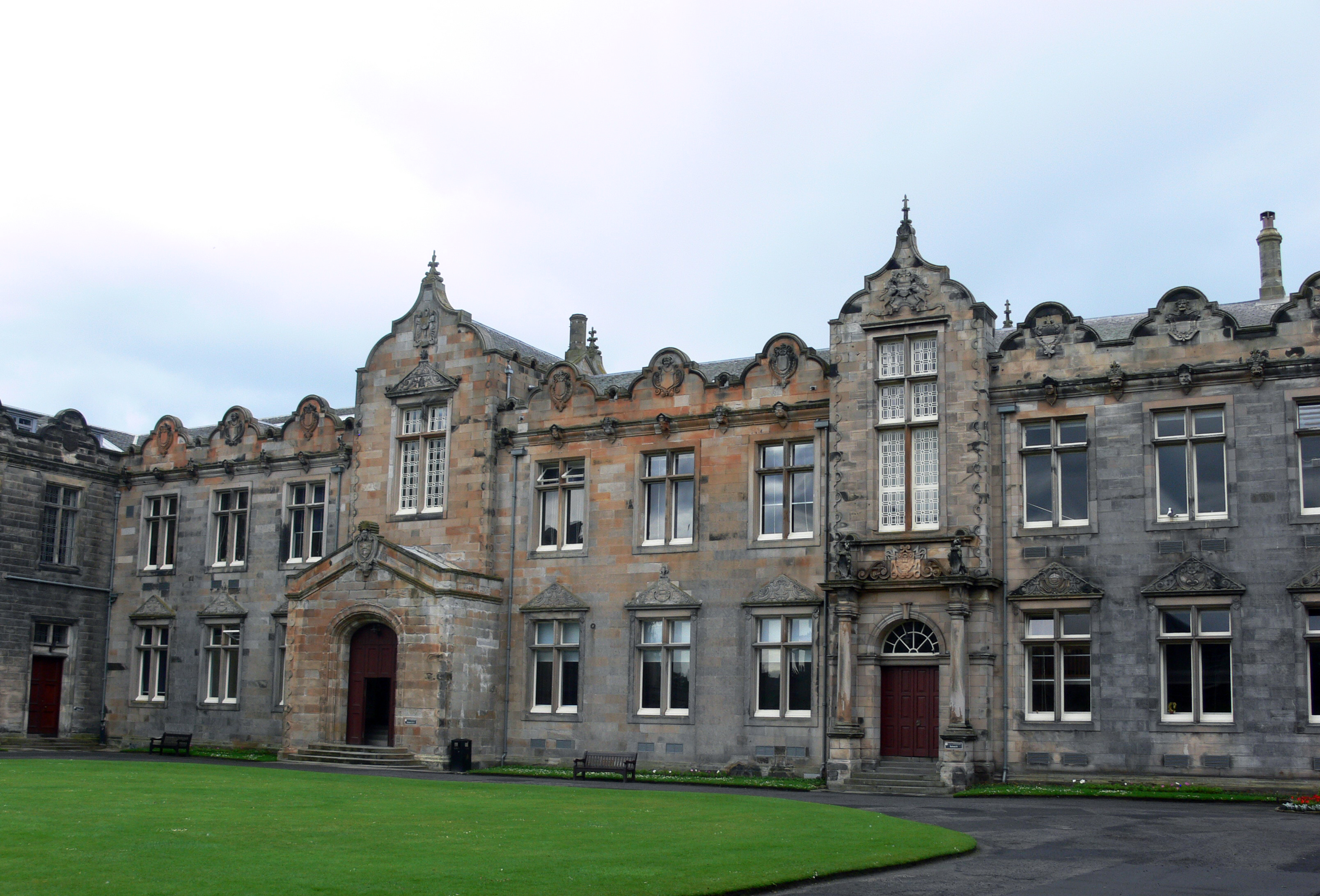
St Salvator's Quad, East wing

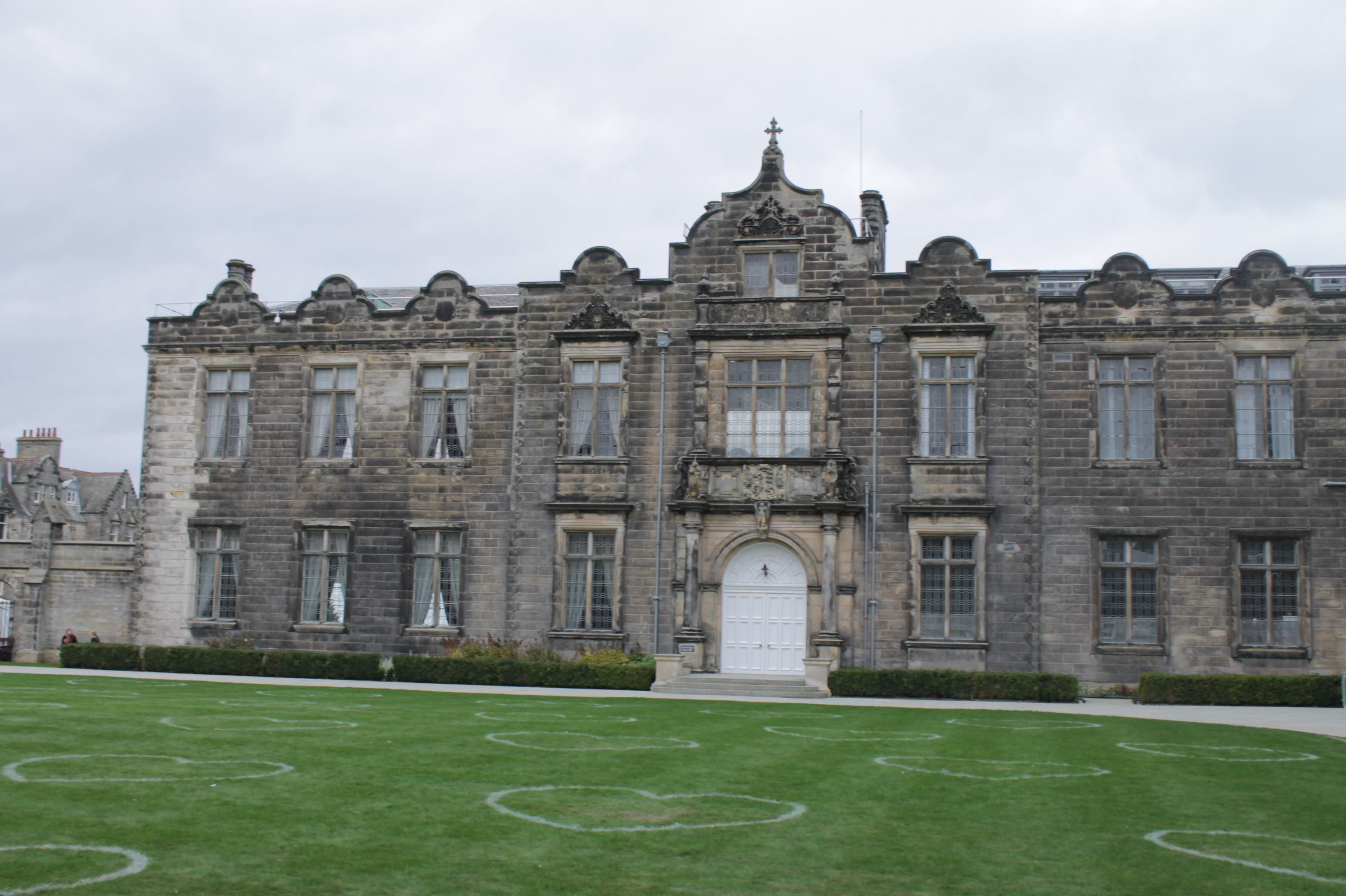
St Salvator's College, St Andrews, north wing

St Salvator's College was founded in 1450 by James Kennedy, Bishop of St Andrews. It is named after Jesus of Nazareth, and refers to his title as savior (or salvator in Latin).

King James II of Scotland had provided an endowment at the college's foundation and this allowed the training of ten students. Several of the original medieval buildings survive, including the college chapel, tower, tenement building (adjoining to the west of tower, actually older than the adjoining tower, but much restored) and the Hebdomadar's building.

The dramatic west tower was built in the 1460s with the upper part of the spire being remodelled in 1851 by the Edinburgh architect Robert Matheson.

In 1528, the Protestant martyr, Patrick Hamilton, was burned alive outside the college, though Hamilton himself was a member of St Leonard's college.

Initially a college of Theology and the Arts, St Salvator's was created to revitalize and focus the university after its somewhat disorderly foundation.

Due to financial considerations, fall in student numbers and general decline of the university, St Salvator's and St Leonard's Colleges amalgamated into the United College of Saint Salvator and Saint Leonard in 1747. Shortly after this, the initial site of St Leonard's College was sold, though the university retained ownership of St Leonard's College Chapel. Although the buildings of St Salvator's College (including the college chapel) were grand by medieval standards, they eventually fell into disrepair. From 1837 the quadrangle was rebuilt and extended into its current form, with a north and a west wing in Jacobean style (in similar style to Madras College on South Street built at the same time). To the south is the Chapel, where many university services are held.

St Salvator's College was residential until the unification with St Leonard's. The current St Salvator's Hall (built from the 1930s), which lies east of the college, is one of the halls of residence for students.

The chapel, tower and Hebdomadar's Building are all designated as Category A listed buildings by Historic Scotland. Other buildings and structures are listed as Category B.

The college chapel is unusual for a collegiate church in that the main entrance faces out into the town, and not like those in Oxford or Cambridge, closed into the college itself. It is indeed the only collegiate chapel in Scotland with this arrangement. From 1761 the chapel was used as a parish church after the St Leonard's college chapel lost its roof in the 1750s, and this arrangement continued until this arrangement was withdrawn by the university in 1904, when the chapel became the University Chapel. The 1450 college had cloister buildings to the north of the college chapel - the two doors to the north side of the chapel show the alignment of the cloister.

Today, with the university having abandoned the Collegiate system in all but name, the St Salvator's/United College site houses various lecture theatres, and the departments of Spanish, Russian, and social anthropology. It is commonly referred to as “the quad”, and is the setting of Raisin Monday festivities, the finish point of the post-Graduation processions, and occasionally hosts student events.

== Bibliography ==
- R.G. Cant The University of St. Andrews, A Short History (Oliver and Boyd Ltd. 1946)
