= Robert Kerr Hannay =

Scottish historian

Robert Kerr Hannay FRSE RSA (31 December 1867, Glasgow – 19 March 1940, Edinburgh) was a Scottish historian. He served as Historiographer Royal for Scotland and Chair of Scottish History and Palaeography at the University of Edinburgh.

Hannay collected and calendared the letters of both James IV and James V, and wrote The Early History of the Scottish Signet.

== Life ==
Hannay was born in Glasgow on 31 December 1867. He was the eldest of seven children of Elizabeth McDowall of Alloa, and Thomas Hannay (1841–1916). His father owned the estate of Rusco, but in 1878 had sold it to settle debts, thereafter becoming an agent for the iron-masters William Whitwell & Co. The family thereafter lived at 16 Woodside Terrace in Glasgow. Hannay was educated at the Albany Academy in Glasgow. He then went first to the University of Glasgow and the University of Oxford graduating with an MA from the latter in 1891.

Hannay began lecturing in Ancient History at the University College, Dundee (then a part of the University of St Andrews) in 1894. In 1901 he transferred to the University of St Andrews. From 1911 to 1919, Hannay left academia to act as Curator of Register House in Edinburgh. From 1919 to 1930, he was Sir William Fraser Professor of Scottish History and Palaeography the University of Edinburgh. From 1930, he became Historiographer Royal for Scotland.

In 1922, he was elected a Fellow of the Royal Society of Edinburgh. His proposers were Cargill Gilston Knott, James Hartley Ashworth, James Alfred Ewing, and Sir Edmund Taylor Whittaker. The University of St Andrews awarded him an honorary doctorate (LLD) in 1923.

He was living at 5 Royal Terrace, Edinburgh, in 1936 and died in Edinburgh on 19 March 1940.

== Family ==
In 1899 he married Jane Ewing Wilson CBE (died 1938), daughter of Rev John Stewart Wilson DD of New Abbet. They had one son, Robert Stewart Erskine Hannay (born 1900).

He is the grandfather of writer Robert Alastair Hannay.

== Publications ==
- The Arch-Bishops of St Andrews (co-written with Sir John Herkless) (1907)
- St Cuthbert's Kirk and its Saint (1933)
- The Letters of James IV (1953)
- The Letters of James V (1954)
