= Alexander Stewart (moderator) =

Scottish minister

Alexander Stewart (died 1915) was a Scottish minister, who was principal of St Andrews University. He was Moderator of the General Assembly of the Church of Scotland in 1911.

== Life ==
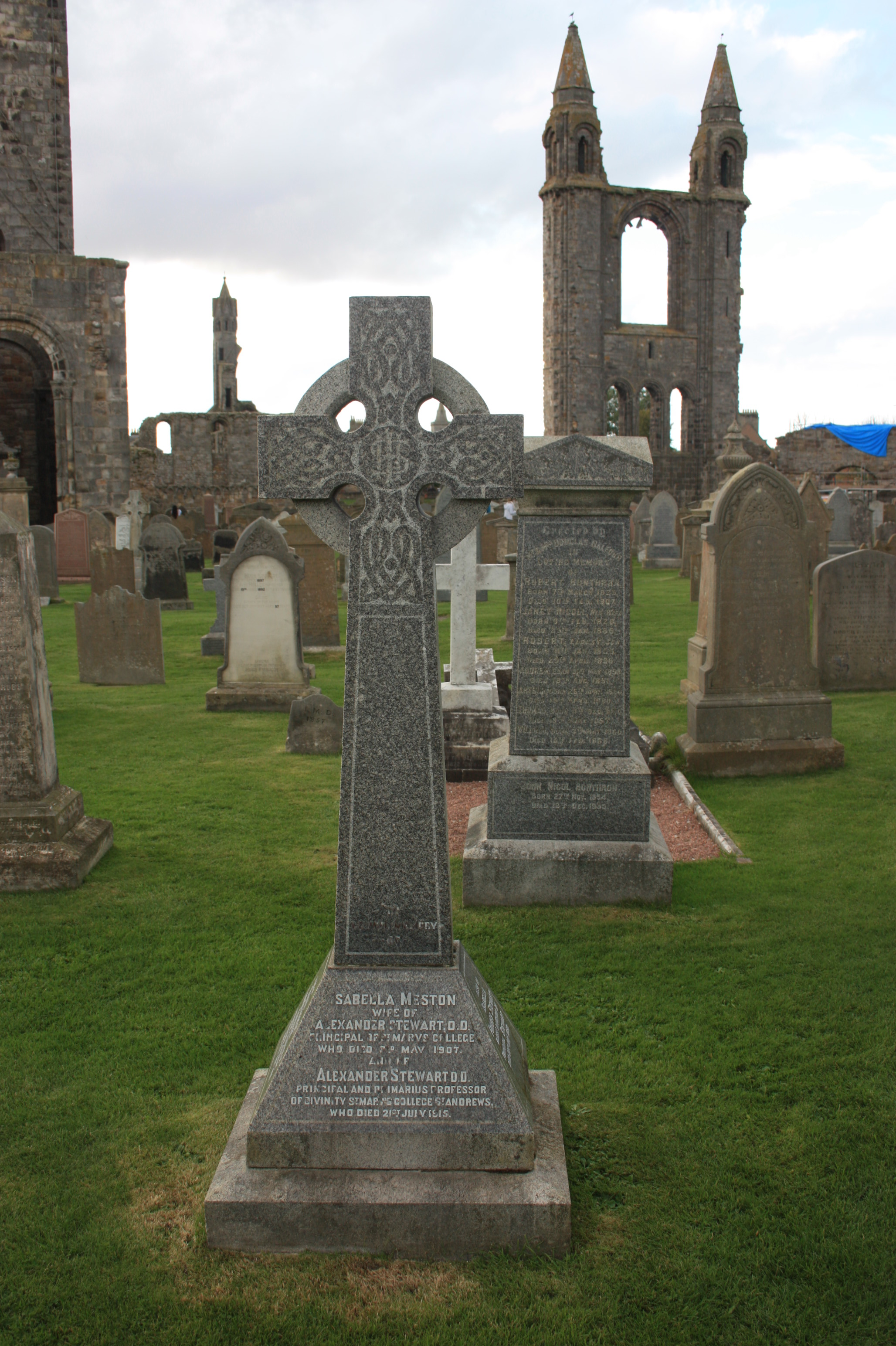
The grave of Very Rev Alexander Stewart, St Andrews Cathedral graveyard

He was born in Liverpool.

He was professor of divinity at St Andrews University. Following the death of James Donaldson (classical scholar) in March 1915 Stewart was made principal of the university.

Following a brief illness he died on 21 July 1915 having served only a few months in the role of principal. He is buried in the burial grounds of St Andrews Cathedral.

== Family ==
In July 1874, at St Machar's Cathedral in Aberdeen, he was married to Isabella Meston (1849–1907).
