= David Fletcher (bishop) =

Scottish minister of the Church of Scotland and Bishop of Argyll (c.1607–1665)

The Right Reverend David Fletcher
- Bishop of Argyll
- Diocese: Diocese of Argyll
- In office: 1662–1665
- Predecessor: Episcopacy Abolished (1638–1665)
- Successor: John Young
- Other posts: Old Kirk, St Giles (1635–1641); Melrose (1641–1662)

Orders
- Consecration: 1662 by Andrew Fairfoul

Personal details
- Born: 1607 Dundee
- Died: March 1665 The Palace, Lismore
- Denomination: Church of Scotland
- Residence: The Palace, Lismore
- Parents: Andrew Fletcher
- Spouse: Elizabeth Strang
- Education: University of St Andrews

David Fletcher (c.1607–March 1665) was a 17th-century senior clergyman in the Church of Scotland who was Bishop of Argyll from 1662 to 1665.

== Background ==
He was the second son of Andrew Fletcher a Dundee merchant, related to the Fletchers of Innerpeffer and Saltoun. His brother Sir John Fletcher was Lord Advocate of Scotland from 1661 to 1664. His date of birth is unclear but he graduated MA from St Andrews University in 1625.

== Career ==
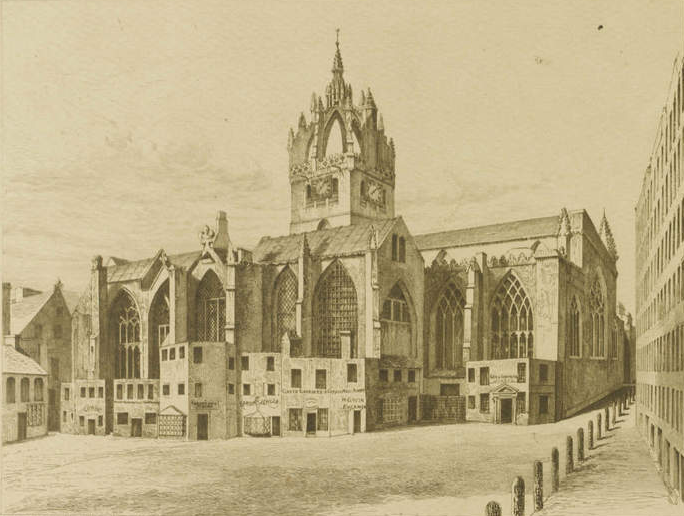
St Giles in the 17th century

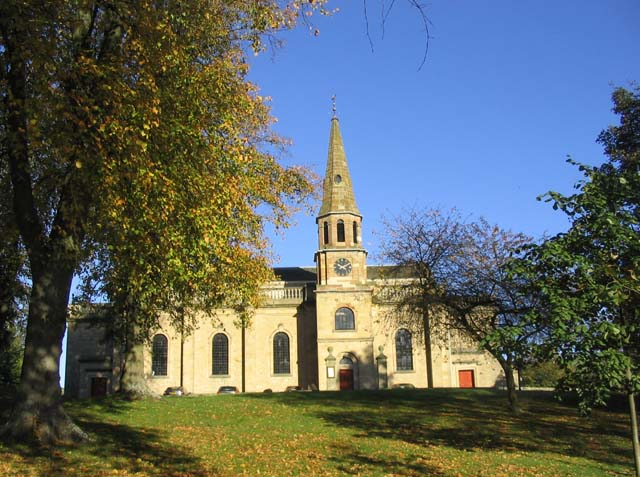
Melrose Parish Church

In 1635 Edinburgh town council elected Fletcher as minister in second charge in the Old Kirk, St Giles (then split into four sections, with two ministers per section). He was deposed from this post in January 1639 both for declining the previous Assembly in Glasgow and for reading and defending the Scottish Book of Common Prayer but was allowed to return to his post in August 1639.

In 1641 he translated From St Giles to Melrose. In 1662 he was consecrated by Archbishop Andrew Fairfoul at Glasgow Cathedral as Bishop of Argyll. The position as Bishop permitted Fletcher a place in the Scottish Parliament.

He died in March 1665 and was replaced by the short-lived Bishop John Young who died before he was consecrated. He had jointly functioned as minister of Melrose until his death and his position there was filled by Alexander Bisset MA.

== Family ==
He married Elizabeth Strang, daughter of John Strang, Principal of Glasgow University. Their daughters included Christian Fletcher and Janet Fletcher. Christian married Henry Home of Kames and they were grandparents to Henry Home, Lord Kames. In 1673 Janet married Thomas Gordon of Buthlaw (d.1690) and she died in 1693. Their son, James Fletcher of New Cranston, died in 1691.
