= Henry Home, Lord Kames =

Scottish philosopher, judge and agricultural improver (1696–1782)

The Right Honourable Lord Kames
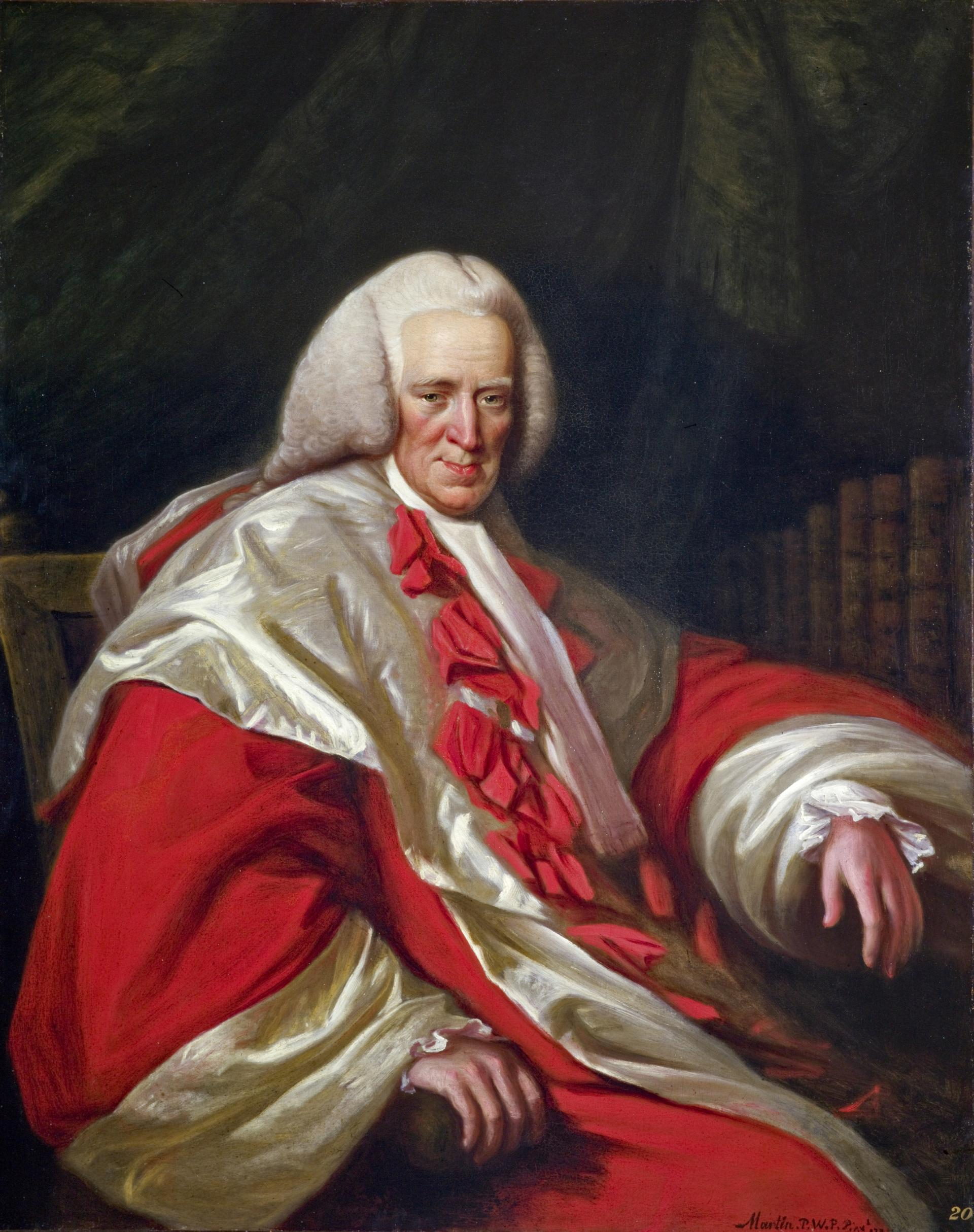
- Portrait of Lord Kames by David Martin

Senator of the College of Justice
- In office 6 February 1752 – 27 December 1782
- Appointed by: George II
- Preceded by: Patrick Campbell, Lord Monzie
- Succeeded by: Alexander Murray, Lord Henderland

Personal details
- Born: 1696
- Died: 27 December 1782 (aged 85–86)
- Spouse: Agatha Drummond
- Relations: David Fletcher (grandfather)
- Children: George Drummond-Home
- Profession: Advocate

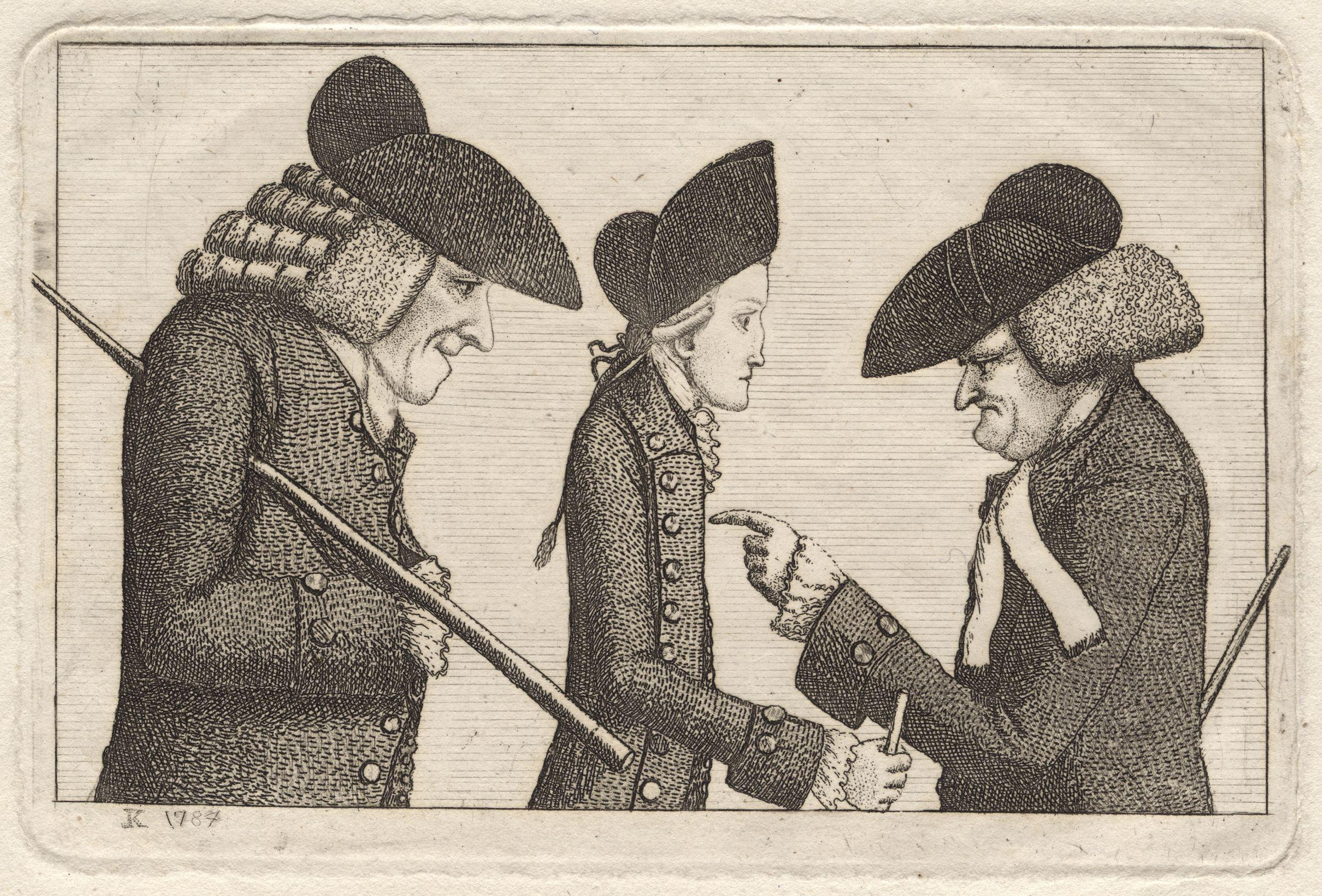
An illustration of Lord Kames, Hugo Arnot and Lord Monboddo by John Kay

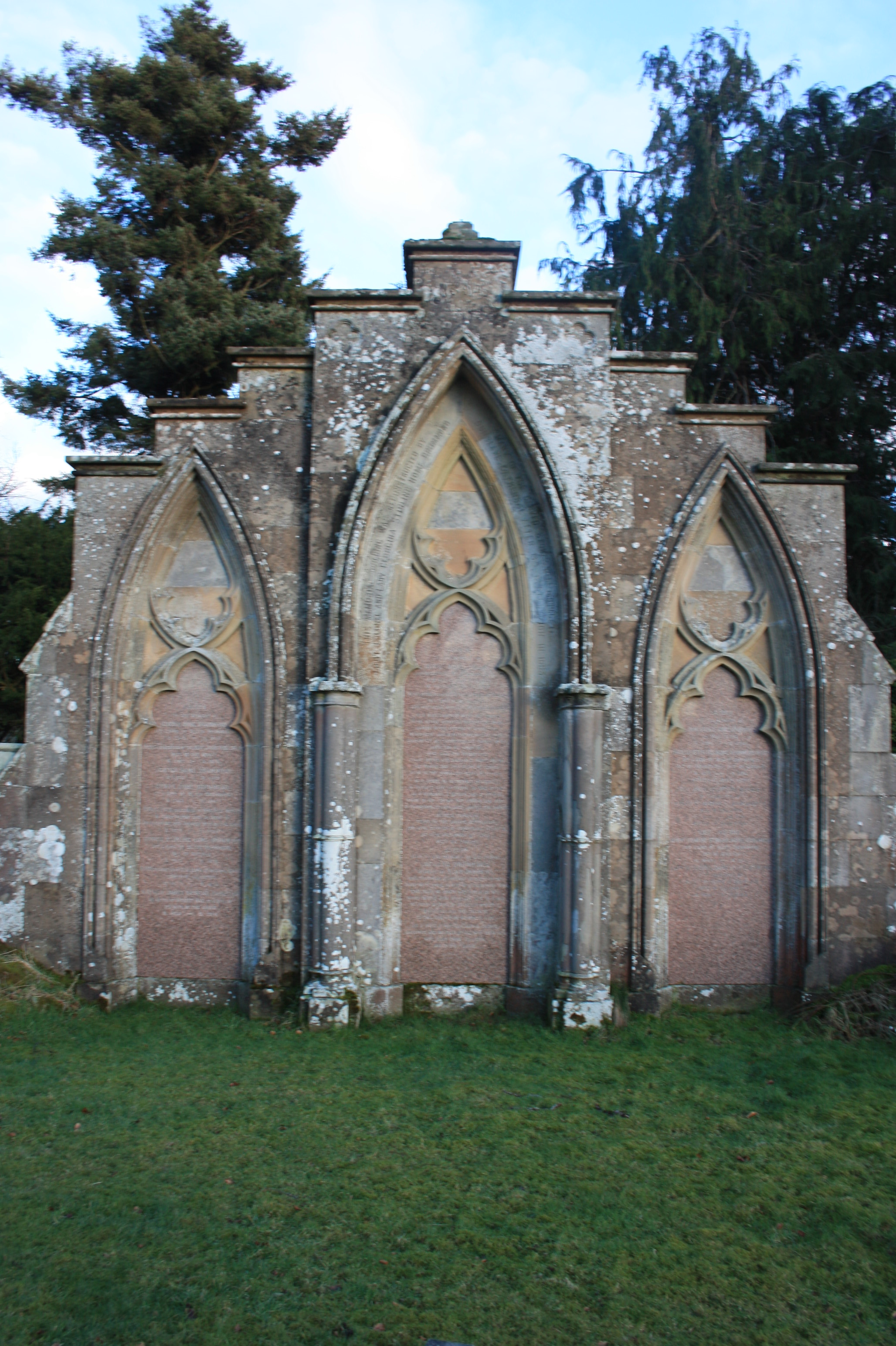
The Home-Drummond grave, Kincardine-in-Menteith

Henry Home, Lord Kames (1696–27 December 1782) was a Scottish writer, philosopher and judge who played a major role in Scotland's Agricultural Revolution. A central figure of the Scottish Enlightenment, he was a founding member of the Philosophical Society of Edinburgh and active in The Select Society. Home acted as patron to some of the most influential thinkers of the Scottish Enlightenment, including philosopher David Hume, economist Adam Smith, writer James Boswell, philosopher William Cullen and naturalist John Walker.

== Life ==
Henry Home was born in 1696 at Kames House, between Eccles and Birgham, in Berwickshire. Henry was the son of George Home of Kames (son of Henry Home (d.1690) of Kames and Christian Fletcher, daughter of David Fletcher, Bishop of Argyll), and his wife Agnes or Helen Walkinshaw. Henry was homeschooled by Mr Wingate, a private tutor, until the age of 16. In 1712, Home was apprenticed as a lawyer under a Writer to the Signet in Edinburgh, and was called to the Scottish bar as an advocate bar in 1724. He soon acquired reputation by a number of publications on the civil and Scottish law, and was one of the leaders of the Scottish Enlightenment. In 1752, he was "raised to the bench", thus acquiring the title of Lord Kames.

Kames held an interest in the development and production of linen in Scotland. Kames was one of the original proprietors of the British Linen Company, serving as a director of the company from 1754 to 1756. Kames was on the panel of judges in the Knight v. Wedderburn case which ruled that slavery was illegal in Scotland. In 1775, he lived in a townhouse in Canongate. The house was located the head of the street's east side, facing onto the Canongate.

He died of old age, aged 86, and is buried in the Home-Drummond plot at Kincardine-in-Menteith west of Blair Drummond.

== Writings ==
Home wrote much about the importance of property to society. In his Essay Upon Several Subjects Concerning British Antiquities, written just after the Jacobite rising of 1745, he showed that the politics of Scotland were based not on loyalty to Kings, as the Jacobites had said, but on the royal land grants that lay at the base of feudalism, the system whereby the sovereign maintained "an immediate hold of the persons and property of his subjects".

In Historical Law Tracts Home described a four-stage model of social evolution that became "a way of organizing the history of Western civilization". The first stage was that of the hunter-gatherer, wherein families avoided each other as competitors for the same food. The second was that of the herder of domestic animals, which encouraged the formation of larger groups but did not result in what Home considered a true society. No laws were needed at these early stages except those given by the head of the family, clan, or tribe. Agriculture was the third stage, wherein new occupations such as "plowman, carpenter, blacksmith, stonemason" made "the industry of individuals profitable to others as well as to themselves", and a new complexity of relationships, rights, and obligations required laws and law enforcers. A fourth stage evolved with the development of market towns and seaports, "commercial society", bringing yet more laws and complexity but also providing more benefit. Lord Kames could see these stages within Scotland itself, with the pastoral Highlands, the agricultural Lowlands, the "polite" commercial towns of Glasgow and Edinburgh, and in the Western Isles a remaining culture of rude huts where fishermen and gatherers of seaweed eked out their subsistence living.

Home was a polygenist, he believed God had created different races on earth in separate regions. In his book Sketches of the History of Man, in 1774, Home claimed that the environment, climate, or state of society could not account for racial differences, so that the races must have come from distinct, separate stocks.

The above studies created the genre of the story of civilization and defined the fields of anthropology and sociology and therefore the modern study of history for two hundred years.

In the popular book Elements of Criticism (1762) Home interrogated the notion of fixed or arbitrary rules of literary composition, and endeavoured to establish a new theory based on the principles of human nature. The late eighteenth-century tradition of sentimental writing was associated with his notion that "the genuine rules of criticism are all of them derived from the human heart." Neil Rhodes has argued that Lord Kames played a significant role in the development of English as an academic discipline in the Scottish Universities.

== Family ==
He was married to Agatha Drummond of Blair Drummond. Their children included George Drummond-Home.

== Major works ==
- Remarkable Decisions of the Court of Session 1706 to 1728 (1728)
- Essays upon Several Subjects in Law (1732)
- Decisions of the Court of Session from its First Institution to the Year 1740 (1740)
- Essay Upon Several Subjects Concerning British Antiquities (1747)
- Essays on the Principles of Morality and Natural Religion (1751) He advocates the doctrine of philosophical necessity.
- The Statute Law of Scotland (1757)
- Historical Law-Tracts (1758)
- The Principles of Equity (1760)
- Introduction to the Art of Thinking (1761)
- Elements of Criticism (1762) Published by two Scottish booksellers, Andrew Millar and Alexander Kincaid.
- Remarkable Decisions of the Court of Session from 1730 to 1752 (1766)
- Gentleman Farmer (1772)
- Sketches of the History of Man (1773)
- Elucidations Respecting the Common and Statute Law of Scotland (1777)
- Loose Hints upon Education (1781)

== See also ==
- George Anderson (minister)

== Literature ==
- Crawford, Robert, ed. (1998). The Scottish Invention of English Literature. Cambridge University Press. ISBN 978-0-5215-9038-9. OCLC 1075448746.
- Grant, James (1881). Cassell's Old and New Edinburgh. Vol. III. OCLC 977900584.
- Herman, Arthur (2001). How the Scots invented the Modern World. New York: MJF Books. ISBN 978-1-6067-1049-4. OCLC 1035881924.
- Home, Henry (1747). Essays upon several subjects concerning British antiquities. Edinburgh. OCLC 1156401996.
- Home, Henry (1761). Historical law-tracts. OCLC 707960637.
- Home, Henry (1766). The Progress of Flax Husbandry in Scotland. Edinburgh. ISBN 978-1-3799-2440-1. OCLC 315286892.
- Home, Henry (1796). Elements of Criticism. Vol. 1. OCLC 745333311.
- Jackson, John P.; Weidman, Nadine M. (2004). Largent, Mark A. (ed.). Race, Racism, and Science: Social Impact and Interaction. ABC-CLIO. ISBN 978-1-8510-9448-6. OCLC 940814226.
- Malcolm, Charles Alexander (1950). The History of the British Linen Bank. ASIN B0007J336C. OCLC 3237473.
- Millar, Andrew (16 July 1765). "Business while absent from London". Letter to Thomas Cadell.
- Williamson, Peter (1776). Williamson's directory for the city of Edinburgh, Canongate, Leith, and suburbs, from June 1775, to June 1776. Edinburgh. OCLC 558664393.
