= George Anderson (minister) =

Scottish minister of religion (1677–1756)

George Anderson (1677–1756) was a prominent Scottish minister during the Enlightenment. He is principally remembered for being the prime sponsor of a motion to excommunicate David Hume and Lord Kames in church courts. He also wrote several rebuttals to what he perceived as radical in Hume's writings.
