= John Tulloch =

Scottish theologian

The Reverend James Tulloch
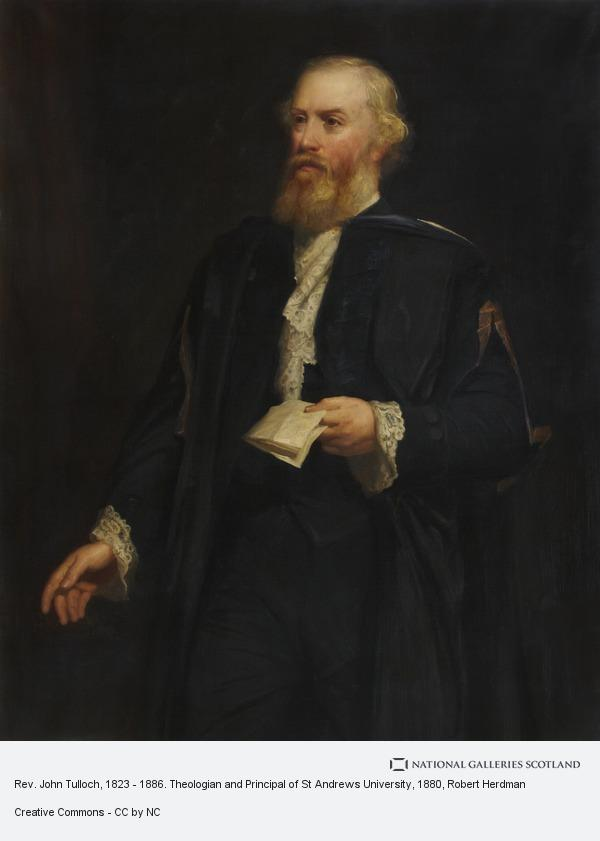
- John Tulloch, 1880 portrait by Robert Herdman

Principal of the University of St Andrews
- In office 1859–1886
- Preceded by: Sir David Brewster
- Succeeded by: Sir James Donadlson

Personal details
- Born: 1 June 1823 Bridge of Earn, Perthshire, Scotland
- Died: 13 February 1886 (aged 62) Torquay, Devon, England
- Spouse: Jane Anne Sophia
- Education: Perth Grammar School
- Alma mater: University of St Andrews; University of Edinburgh
- Profession: Theologian, Presbyterian minister

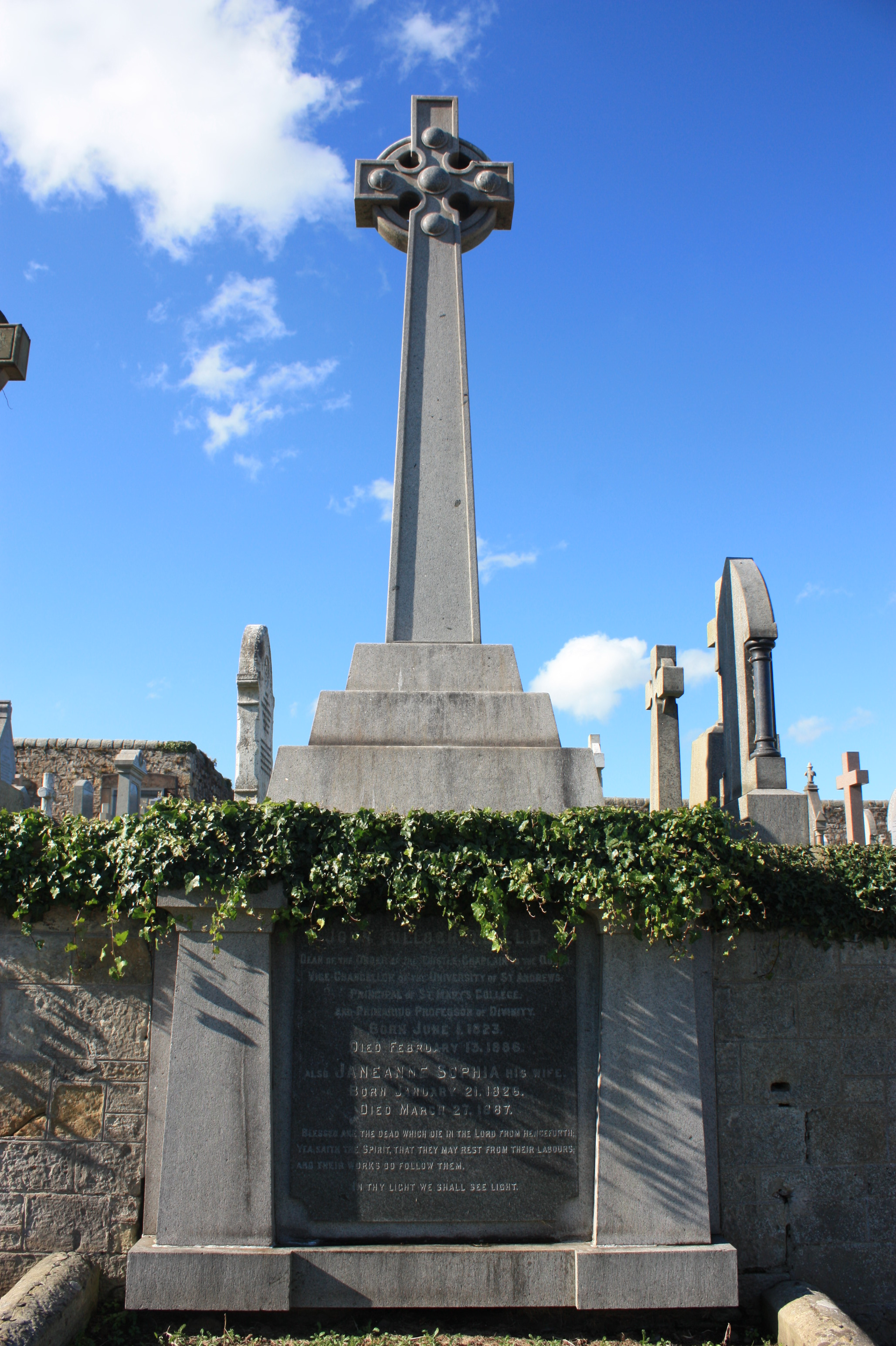
The grave of John Tulloch, Eastern Cemetery, St Andrews

John Tulloch (1 June 1823 – 13 February 1886) was a Scottish theologian and Presbyterian minister.

== Life ==
Tulloch was born at Dron, south of Bridge of Earn, Perthshire, one of twin sons of Elizabeth (née Maclaren), the daughter of a Perthshire farmer, and William Weir Tulloch, parish minister of Tibbermore, near Perth.

He was educated at Perth Grammar School and studied Divinity at the universities of St Andrews and Edinburgh. He was licensed to preach by the Presbytery of Perth in March 1844. In March 1845 (following a period as assistant) he was ordained as minister of St Paul's church in Dundee, and in 1849 was translated to Kettins, in Strathmore, where he remained for six years. In 1854 he was appointed Principal of St Mary's College, St Andrews. The appointment was immediately followed by the appearance of his Burnet prize essay on Theism.

At St Andrews, where Tulloch was also professor of systematic theology and apologetics, his teaching was distinguished by several novel features. He lectured on comparative religion and treated doctrine historically, as being not a fixed product but a growth. He was appointed as one of Her Majesty's Chaplains for Scotland and preached a number of sermons before Her Majesty the Queen in Scotland between 1866 and 1876.

Tulloch was popular with his students. In 1862 he was appointed a clerk of the General Assembly, and from then on he took a leading part in the councils of the Church of Scotland. Tulloch was also deeply interested in the reorganization of education in Scotland, both in school and university, and acted as one of the temporary board which settled the primary school system under the Education (Scotland) Act 1872.

In 1878 Tulloch was chosen to be Moderator of the General Assembly, and did much to widen the national church. Two positions on which he repeatedly insisted took a firm hold—first, that a church must be comprehensive of various views and tendencies, and that a national church especially should seek to represent all the elements of the life of the nation; secondly, that subscription to a creed can bind no one to all its details, but only to the sum and substance, or the spirit, of the symbol.

For three years before Tulloch's death he was convener of the church interests committee of the Church of Scotland, which had to deal with agitation for disestablishment. In 1884, he was a guest at Haddo House for a dinner hosted by John Hamilton-Gordon, 1st Marquess of Aberdeen and Temair in honour of William Ewart Gladstone on his tour of Scotland.

Tulloch died at Torquay, in 1886. A biography was written by Mrs Oliphant. His body was returned to Scotland for burial. He is buried beneath a large memorial at the centre of the Eastern Cemetery in St Andrews. His wife, Jane Anne Sophia (1826-1887) is buried with him.

== Works ==
Tulloch's best-known works are collections of biographical sketches of leaders in church history, including those of the Reformation and Puritanism. His major work, Rational Theology and Christian Philosophy (1872), treats the Cambridge Platonists and other 17th century latitudinarians in a similar way. He delivered the second series of the Croall lectures, on the Doctrine of Sin, which were afterwards published. He also published a small work, The Christ of the Gospels and the Christ of History, in which the views of Ernest Renan on the gospel history were dealt with; a monograph on Blaise Pascal for Blackwood's Foreign Classics for English Readers series; and a little work, Beginning Life, addressed to young men, written at an earlier period.

=== Books ===
- English Puritanism and Its Leaders: Cromwell, Milton, Baxter, Bunyan. Edinburgh: William Blackwood and Sons, 1861.
- Beginning Life a Book for Young Men. London: Alexander Strahan & Co., 1863.
- Rational Theology and Christian Philosophy, 2 vols. Edinburgh and London: William Blackwood and Sons, 1872; second edition, 1874.
- Luther and other Leaders of the Reformation. Edinburgh and London: William Blackwood and Sons, 1883
- Modern Theories in Philosophy and Religion. Edinburgh and London: William Blackwood and Sons, 1884.

Academic offices
Preceded by Sir David Brewster	Principal of the University of St Andrews; 1859–1886	Succeeded by Sir James Donaldson
