= St Leonard's College, St Andrews =

Postgraduate institute in Scotland

St Leonard's College
- Coat of arms of St Leonard's College
- Former name: The College of Poor Clerks of the Church of St Andrews
- Type: Postgraduate College
- Established: 1512; 514 years ago 1747 - merged into United College; 1974 - reconstituted as a postgraduate college
- Affiliations: University of St Andrews
- Provost: Dr Morven Shearer
- Students: 1,837 (2024-2025)
- Location: St Andrews, Fife, Scotland
Colours
St Leonard’s College
- Website: St Leonard's College

St Leonard's College is a postgraduate institute at the University of St Andrews in St Andrews, Scotland. Founded in 1512 as an autonomous theological college of the University of St Andrews, it merged with St Salvator's College in 1747 to form the United College. In 1974 it was re-instituted as a postgraduate institute.

== History ==
Named after the 6th-century Frankish saint Leonard of Noblac, St Leonard's College of the University of St Andrews was founded as 'The College of Poor Clerks of the Church of St Andrews' in 1512 by Alexander Stewart, Archbishop of St Andrews and John Hepburn, Prior of St Andrews (receiving Papal recognition by proxy in 1545), on the site of St Leonard's Hospital and Church. Its founding was a result of the poverty and declining status of St John's College, also known as the Pedagogy.

The first Provost of St Leonard's was the Dominican John Annand, a pupil of Jan Standonck and a determined reformer of the clergy. St Leonard's was consequently extremely monastic in nature, with members of the college being subjected to a far more rigorous and formal code of conduct than was in practice at St Salvator's.

Because of financial considerations and the general decline of the university, in 1747 St Salvator's and St Leonard's Colleges were amalgamated to form the United College of St Salvator and St Leonard. The buildings of St Leonard's College on South Street were sold, and all teaching thereafter was on the St Salvator's site on North Street.

Famous alumni of St Leonard's College include Alexander Ales (Alesius), John Knox, George Buchanan, Patrick Adamson and James Melville.

=== Re-establishment ===
In 1974 a new St Leonard's College was established as a non-statutory college exclusively for postgraduate students and postdoctoral fellows. Currently, after matriculation, all postgraduate students are de facto members of St Leonard’s College. The head of the college retains the medieval title of the older St Leonard's College, Provost. During 2024, St Leonard's College celebrated its 50th Anniversary since its reconstitution as a Postgraduate College with a variety of activities.

=== Notable Principals ===
- George Buchanan from 1568 to 1570
- Robert Wilkie from 1591 to 1611 (Moderator of the Church of Scotland in 1600)
- Joseph McCormick from 1781 to 1799 (Moderator of the Church of Scotland in 1782)
- James Playfair from 1799 to 1819
- Francis Nicoll from 1820 to 1835
- John Lee 1837/8 (Moderator of the Church of Scotland in 1844)
- David Brewster from 1838 to 1859 (the first principal with no religious background)
- James Donaldson 1886 to 1915 - including the transition to university status in 1890
- Sir John Herkless 1915 to 1920

=== Buildings ===
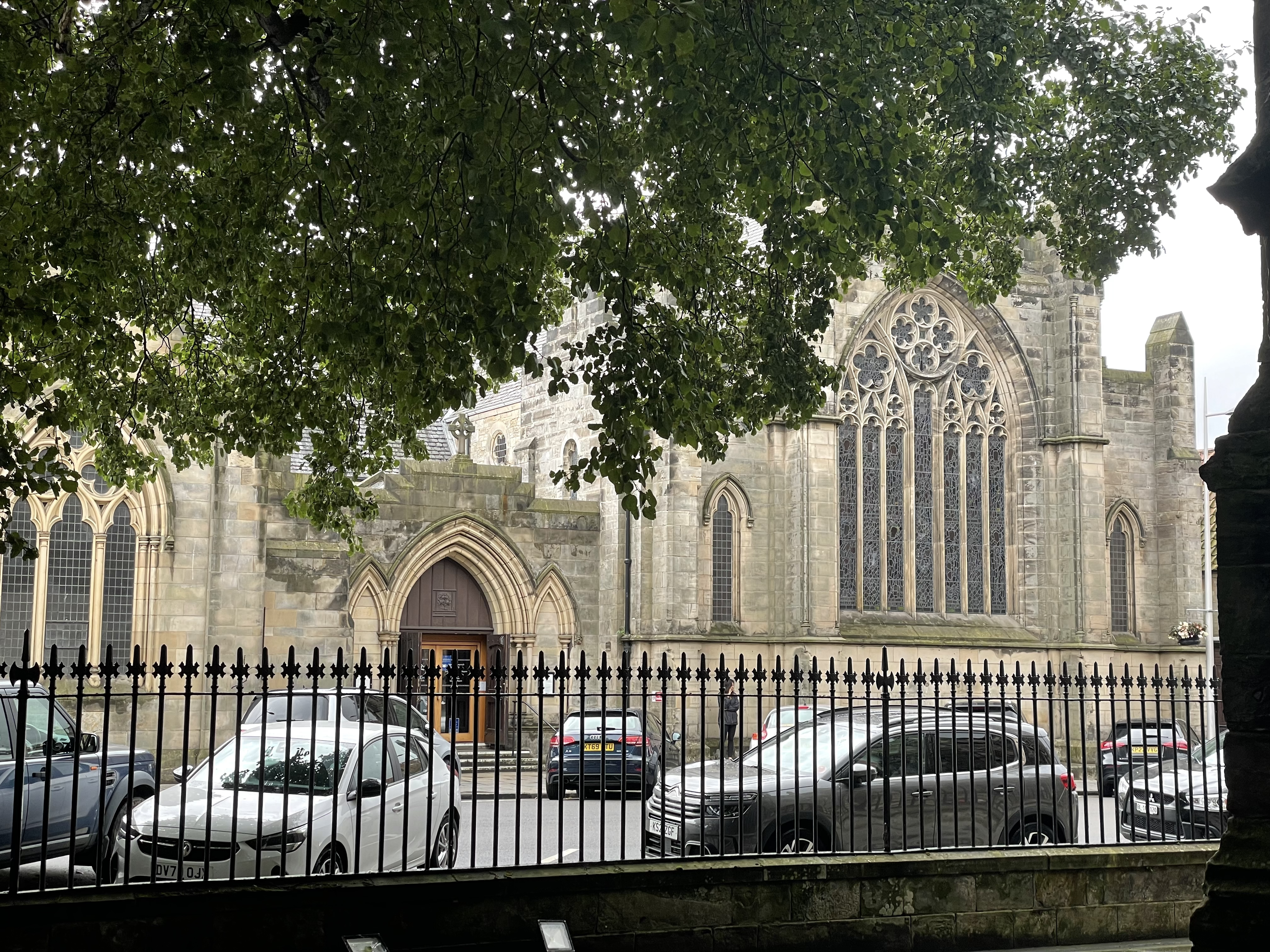
Martyrs Kirk, the university's postgraduate library

The old college site was visited by Samuel Johnson and James Boswell in August 1773. The old college site has, since the late 19th century, been occupied by St Leonards School. The college chapel remains the property of the university. When it was re-established in 1974 it did not own any property, but since then it has accumulated several buildings including Deans Court and the Martyrs Kirk postgraduate library. St Leonard's College has been based in the Old Burgh School since 2020.

=== Provosts of St Leonard's College ===
- Professor Douglas M. G. Lloyd
- Professor Ian Gray Kidd
- Professor Robert Crawford
- Professor Christopher Smout
- Professor Martin Kemp
- Professor John A. Guy
- Professor Philip Francis Esler
- Dr Frank Riddell
- Professor Christopher John Smith
- Professor Peter Clark
- Professor Dina Iordanova
- Professor Malcolm McLeod
- Professor Derek Woollins
- Professor Andy Murphy
- Professor Monique MacKenzie
- Professor Frank Lorenz Müller
- Dr Morven Shearer

== Bibliography ==
- R.G. Cant The University of St Andrews, A Short History (Oliver and Boyd Ltd. 1946)
