= Robert de Cardeny =

Dean then Bishop of Dunkeld between 1390s-1430s

- Bishop of Dunkeld
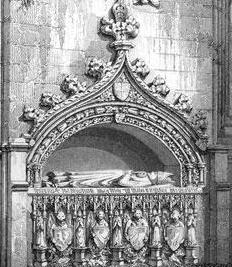
- Church: Roman Catholic Church
- See: Diocese of Dunkeld
- In office: 1398/9–1437
- Predecessor: Robert Sinclair
- Successor: Domhnall MacNeachdainn
- Previous post: Dean of Dunkeld

Orders
- Ordination: x 1394
- Consecration: November 1399

Personal details
- Born: 14th century Scotland
- Died: 16/17 January 1437

Robert de Cardeny was a late 14th and early 15th century Scottish cleric. He was the son of one John Cardeny, and brother of the royal mistress Mariota de Cardeny. His early career is obscure. In 1378–80, King Robert II of Scotland petitioned the Pope for a canonry in the diocese of Moray for one Robert de Cardun, despite the fact that the latter already held canonries and prebends in the diocese of Dunblane and Dunkeld. This Robert de Cardun was both a member of King Robert's household and a student at the University of Paris. Robert had graduated from Paris in 1381 as Licentiate. In 1392 he was a receiver of the "English Nation" at Paris and custodian of the Nation's seal. In 1394 Robert was still in Paris, now as Master Robert de Cardeny

By the time of his provision of the see of Dunkeld in 1398, he already held the position of Dean. He had been provided to the see by Pope Benedict XIII on 17 November 1398, and had been consecrated as Bishop of Dunkeld by the November of the following year. It was said by Alexander Myln that Robert owed his promotion to the affection which King Robert III of Scotland had for Cardeny's sister, Mariota, who had been the mistress of King Robert II, Robert III's father.

Robert enjoyed an episcopate of nearly 40 years. He secured the obedience of the Abbot of Iona to Dunkeld in 1431, and in 1433 witnessed the foundation charter of the Collegiate Church of Methven. Among other activities, he was an auditor for the parliament of 1429–30. His episcopate saw the building of a new nave for Dunkeld Cathedral and the construction of a new chapel devoted to Saint Ninian. Robert fathered at least one son with an unmarried woman, Patrick de Cardeny, who became a clerk of the diocese of Dunkeld. Bishop Robert died on either 16 or 17 January 1437.

== Notes ==
Religious titles
Preceded by Robert Sinclair	Bishop of Dunkeld; 1398/9–1437	Succeeded by Domhnall MacNeachdainn
