= Domhnall MacNeachdainn =

Domhnall MacNeachdainn was a 15th-century Dean and Bishop of Dunkeld. He was the nephew of Robert de Cardeny, Bishop of Dunkeld, by Robert's sister, Mairead (Mariota). The latter was also the mistress of King Robert II of Scotland. His father was probably a chief of the MacNeachdainn (MacNaughton) kindred. Domhnall was university trained, and by 1431 had a M. A. and a Doctorate in Decrees. He had been Dean of Dunkeld since the year 1420. He was one of the commissioners of the Scottish king at the Council of Basel in 1433. In 1437, Bishop Robert de Cardeny died and Domhnall the Dean was elected as his replacement. Domhnall died sometime in the year 1440. Since Alexander Myln at least it has been thought that he sought confirmation from the Papacy and died en route, but direct evidence for this is lacking.

== Notes ==
Religious titles
Preceded by Robert de Cardeny	Bishop of Dunkeld; 1437–1440	Succeeded by James Kennedy
