= Robert Wilkie (moderator) =

Scottish academic

Robert Wilkie (1548–1611) was a senior Church of Scotland who served as Principal of St Leonard's College, St Andrews and both Moderator of the General Assembly of the Church of Scotland in 1600 and Constant Moderator of the Presbytery from 1606 to 1611. The Wilkie Bursary at St Andrews University was funded by his endowment. This has been running for slightly under four centuries, one of the oldest established bursaries in the world.

== Life ==
He was born in St Andrews in 1548 and educated at St Leonard's College under principal John Duncanson, being elected "Regent" (the equivalent of Fellow). In 1586 he was given "first charge" of the parish of St Andrews- one of the most important roles in the Church of Scotland.

He translated to St Leonard's Chapel in October 1591, at the same time taking over Principalship of St Leonard's College. Both these roles were previously held by his paternal uncle James Wilkie (1512–1590).

He sat on the General Assembly from 1594 to 1610 and was elected Moderator, the highest position in the Scottish church, in 1600. He was elected Constant Moderator of the Presbytery of the Church of Scotland in 1606. On 20 June 1610 he was formally presented to the parish by King James VI.

In February 1611 he was placed on the Court of the High Commission.

He died on 26 June 1611 and is buried in the choir of the St Leonards Chapel against the north wall.

He was unmarried and left his estate of 4200 Scots merks to the university. His brother James Wilkie was entrusted to use this to provide for six bursaries at the university. This was formally begun in 1627 as the Wilkie Bursary.
