= James Donaldson (classical scholar) =

Scottish classicist (1831–1915)

Sir James Donaldson FRSE
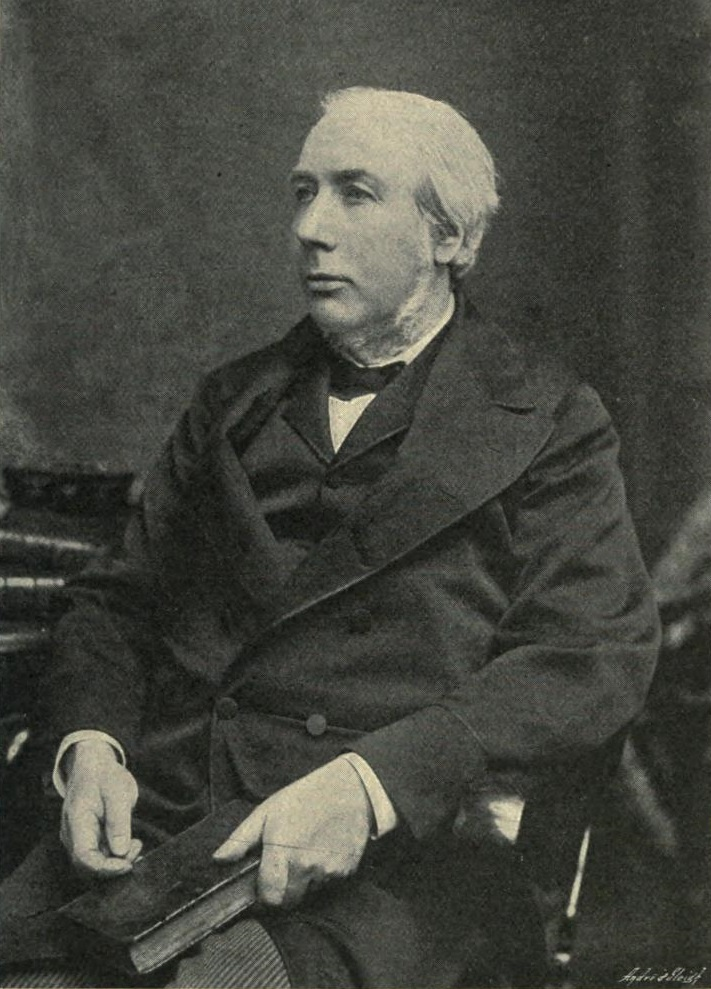

Principal of the University of St Andrews
- In office 1886–1915
- Preceded by: Reverend John Tulloch
- Succeeded by: Sir John Herkless

Personal details
- Born: 26 April 1831 Aberdeen, Aberdeenshire, Scotland
- Died: 9 March 1915 (aged 83)
- Education: Aberdeen Grammar School
- Alma mater: Marischal College, Aberdeen; Berlin University
- Profession: Classical scholar, theological writer

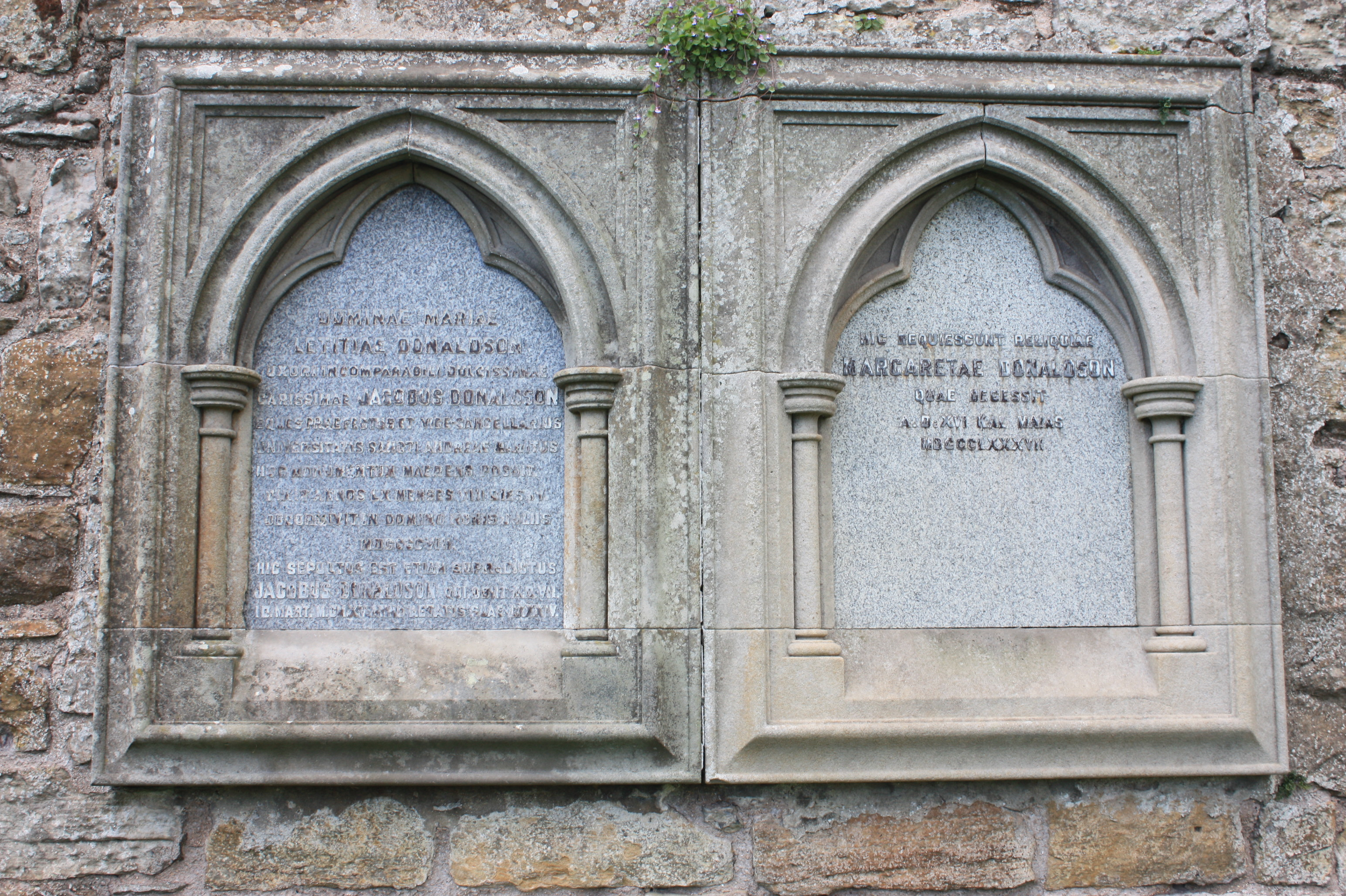
The grave of Chancellor James Donaldson and his family, St Andrews Cathedral churchyard

Sir James Donaldson FRSE (26 April 1831 – 9 March 1915) was a Scottish classical scholar, and educational and theological writer.

== Life ==
Donaldson was born in Aberdeen on 26 April 1831. He was educated at Aberdeen Grammar School, Marischal College, Aberdeen, New College, London, and Berlin University. In 1854 he was appointed Rector of the Stirling High School where he remained for two years, before leaving for the Royal High School of Edinburgh, of which he was appointed Rector in 1866.

He was elected a Fellow of the Royal Society of Edinburgh in 1867, his proposer being Alexander Keith Johnston.

He became in 1881 Professor of Humanity at the University of Aberdeen, and in 1886 Principal of the United Colleges of St Andrews (renamed the University of St Andrews in 1890 by the Universities (Scotland) Act).

He was knighted by Edward VII in 1907, and was awarded an LL.D. by the University of Glasgow and an honorary Doctor of Divinity by the University of Aberdeen in recognition of his work in Church history.

He died on 9 March 1915. and is buried with his wife in the churchyard of St Andrews Cathedral. He also has a memorial in the Church of St John the Evangelist, Edinburgh. He was succeeded in his role as Principal by Very Rev Prof Alexander Stewart, but Stewart died only a few months later.

== Principal works ==
- A Modern Greek Grammar for the Use of Classical Students (1853)
- Lyra Graeca (1854), specimens of Greek lyric poetry from Callinus to Alexandros Soutsos
- The Ante-Nicene Christian Library, in collaboration with Alexander Roberts (24 vols., 1867–72)
- A Critical History of Christian Literature and Christian Doctrine from the Death of the Apostles to the Nicene Council (i.-iii., 1864–1866; new ed. of i. as The Apostolical Fathers, 1874)
- Lectures on the History of Education in Prussia and England (1874)
- Expiatory and Substitutory Sacrifices of the Greeks (1875)
- The Westminster Confession of Faith and the Thirty-Nine Articles of the Church of England (1905)
- Woman, her position and influence in ancient Greece and Rome (1907)

Academic offices
Preceded by Reverend John Tulloch	Principal of the University of St Andrews; 1886–1915	Succeeded by Sir John Herkless
