= United College, St Andrews =

College of the University of St Andrews

United College of St Salvator and St Leonard
- Type: College
- Established: 1747; 279 years ago
- Affiliations: University of St Andrews
- Master: Professor Ineke De Moortel
- Students: 6,109
- Location: St Andrews, Fife, Scotland

The United College of St Salvator and St Leonard (commonly referred to as United College) is one of the two statutory colleges of the University of St Andrews in St Andrews, Scotland. It was founded in 1747 by the merging of St Salvator's College and St Leonard's College when the university was in decline.

The college encompasses the Faculties of Arts, Medicine and Science.

The college no longer functions as an administrative body and its use is purely formal. The other statutory college of the university is St Mary's College which encompasses the university's Faculty of Divinity. A third college, St Leonard's College, was re-established in 1972 as a non-statutory college, which encompasses postgraduate and postdoctoral students.

== Master of the United College ==
The Master of the United College is a senior academic at the University of St Andrews who is charged with carrying out duties as required by the Academic Senate of that University. The post was created to head United College. The Master of the United College is Professor Ineke De Moortel.
