= St Salvator's Chapel =

Chapel in Fife, Scotland

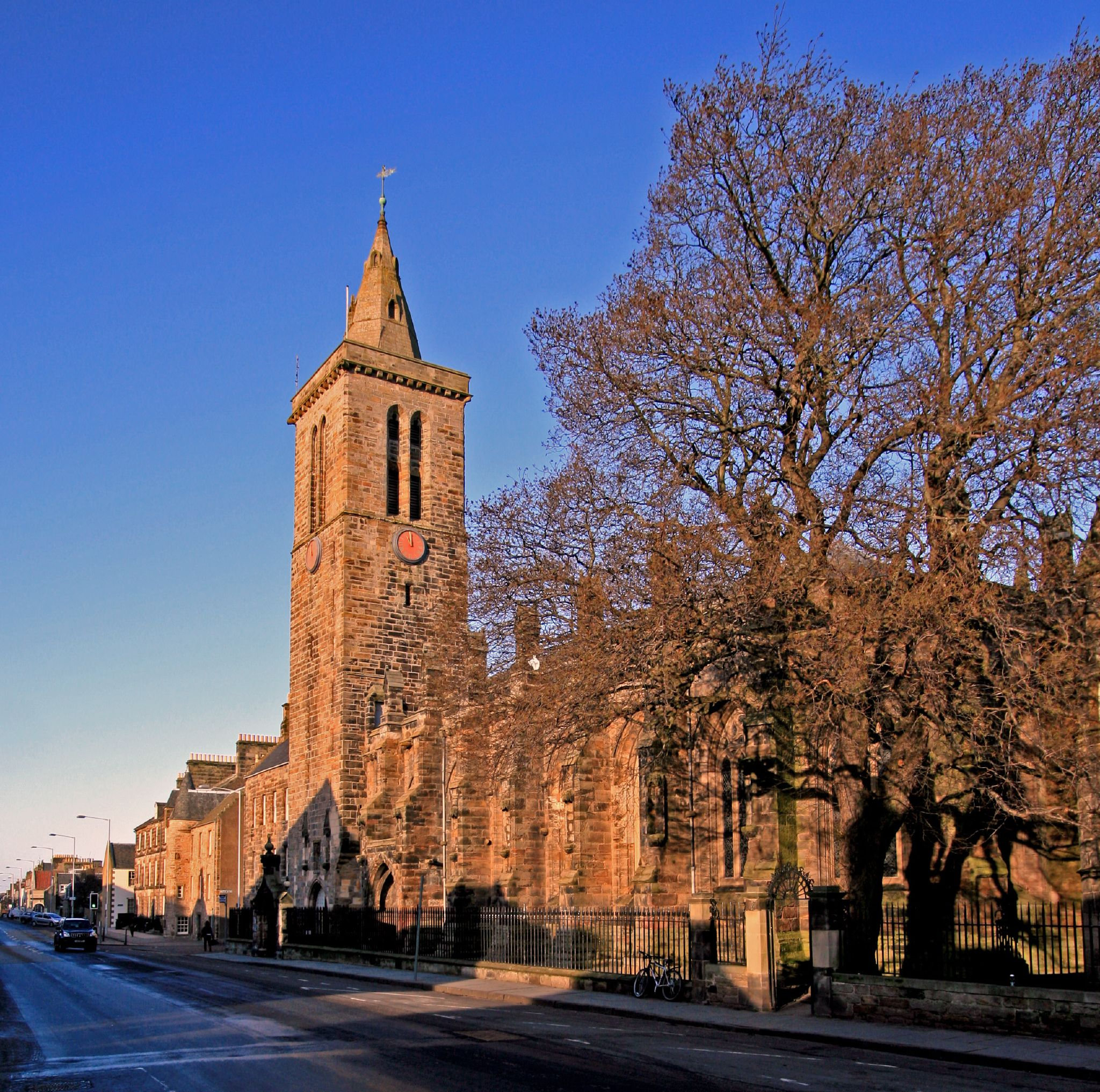
- View from North Street

Religion
- Affiliation: Ecumenical
- Ecclesiastical or organisational status: Collegiate church
- Year consecrated: 1450

Location
- Location: St Andrews, Scotland
- Interactive map of St Salvator's Chapel
- Coordinates: 56.341377°N 2.794368°W

Architecture
- Style: Late Gothic
- Completed: 15th century
- Capacity: 320

Website
- St Salvator's Chapel

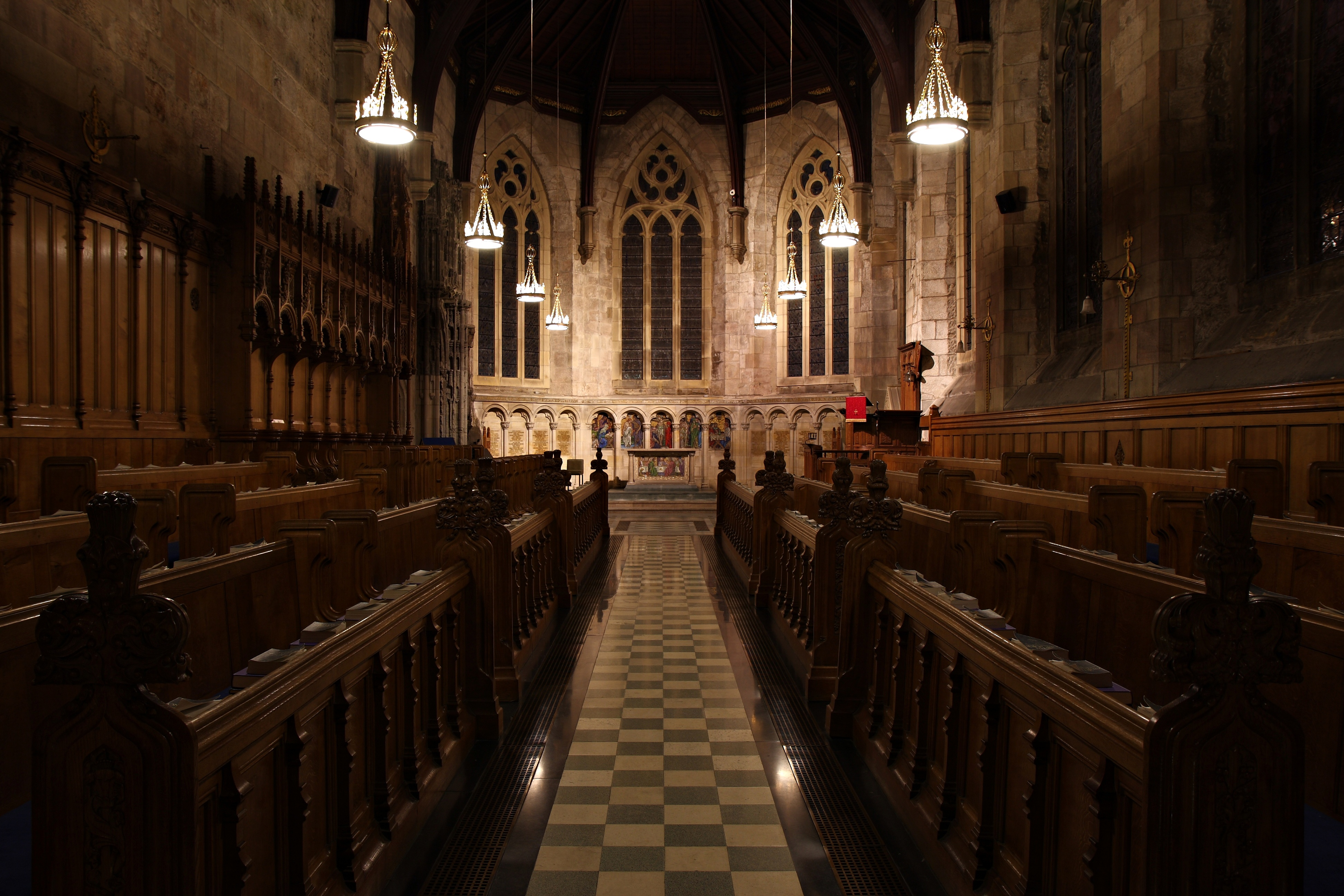
Interior, 2012

Exterior, 2022.

St Salvator's Chapel is one of two collegiate chapels belonging to the University of St Andrews, the other being St Leonard's Chapel. The chapel, also known as St Salvator's College Church, was founded in 1450, by Bishop James Kennedy, built in the Late Gothic architectural style, and refurbished in the 1680s, 1860s and throughout the 20th century. It is the chapel of the United college as well as being the major university chapel.

== Burials ==
- Alexander Burnet
- Bishop James Kennedy
