= Malia Scotch Marmo =

American screenwriter and teacher (born 1955)

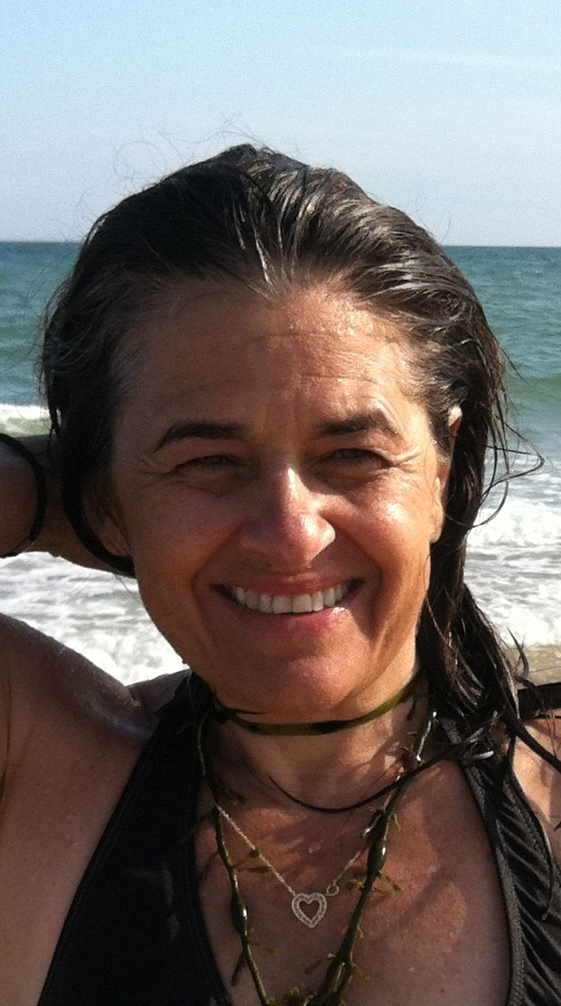
- Scotch Marmo in 2013
- Born: May 4, 1955 (age 71); Wakefield, Massachusetts, U.S.
- Education: Bunker Hill Community College; Boston University (BA); Columbia University (MFA)
- Relatives: Norman A. Scotch

Malia Scotch Marmo (born May 4, 1955) is an American screenwriter and teacher, best known for writing Lasse Hallstrom's Once Around and Steven Spielberg's Hook. Scotch Marmo also collaborated with novelist Soman Chainani in adapting The School for Good and Evil, a Netflix production directed by Paul Feig. Scotch Marmo also teaches screenwriting and, through the Sundance Institute and other organizations, mentors aspiring filmmakers.

In 2012, Scotch Marmo received the Andrew Sarris award, which honors outstanding service and artistic achievement by distinguished Columbia Film Program alumni.

== Early life ==
Scotch Marmo was born and raised in Wakefield, Massachusetts. After receiving an associate degree from Bunker Hill Community College, she went on to earn a bachelor of arts degree as a double major in English Literature and Spanish Language and Literature at Boston University, and her Master of Fine Arts from the Columbia University School of the Arts in 1988. While at Columbia's film school, Scotch Marmo's professors included Frantisek Daniel, Miloš Forman, Martin Scorsese, Annette Insdorf, and Vojtěch Jasný.

== Career ==
=== 1990s ===
While Scotch Marmo was still enrolled in Columbia University's graduate film program, her thesis screenplay was acquired by producers Amy Robinson and Griffin Dunne. Robinson and Dunne brought the script to Swedish director Lasse Hallström and, in 1991, Once Around became his first American film, starring Richard Dreyfus and Holly Hunter. Also while at Columbia, Scotch Marmo directed an award-winning short film entitled A Secret Thing.

During pre-production for Once Around, Scotch Marmo came to the attention of acclaimed film director Steven Spielberg, who hired her to write Hook, also released in 1991. Hook starred Robin Williams as an adult Peter Pan, Dustin Hoffman as Captain Hook, and Julia Roberts as Tinkerbell. Scotch Marmo shared writing credit with James V. Hart and also served as associate producer on the film. While Hook was being shot, Scotch Marmo began working on her next Spielberg project, Jurassic Park, released in 1993. Jurassic Park, which has had six sequels to date, starred Sam Neill, Laura Dern, Jeff Goldblum, and Richard Attenborough. Scotch Marmo wrote the second draft of Jurassic Park, between the drafts of novelist Michael Crichton and David Koepp.

Scotch Marmo was next recruited to rewrite Norman Jewison's Only You while on location in Pittsburgh and Rome. Released in 1994, Only You starred Robert Downey, Jr. and Marisa Tomei as star-crossed lovers. From 1994 to 1997, Scotch Marmo focused on developing two projects that never made it to the screen. For director Alfonso Arau, Scotch Marmo adapted Michael Golding's Simple Prayers, a novel set on a small Venetian island in the fourteenth century, and for director Alfonso Cuaron, Scotch Marmo re-wrote Donald Westlake's Love in the Attic, based on the true story of a 1920s housewife who fell in love with a sewing machine repairman and hid him in the attic while her husband was at home. Scotch Marmo next adapted Ludwig Bemelmans' Madeline book series into Madeline. Scotch Marmo received story credit for the film, which was released in 1998, and was directed by Daisy von Scherler Mayer and starred Frances MacDormand. In 1998, Garry Marshall brought in Scotch Marmo to do a production rewrite on The Other Sister. Released in 1999, the film starred Juliette Lewis and Diane Keaton.

=== 2000s ===
From 1998 to 2002, Scotch Marmo attempted to get an original screenwriting project off the ground as her first feature-length directorial project. When Fritz Left Kate was developed by various producers, including James L. Brooks, who saw it as a vehicle for Woody Harrelson and Tea Leoni, but the film was not realized. In 2000, Castle Rock Entertainment and Playtone Company hired Scotch-Marmo to adapt Chris Van Allsburg's children's classic The Polar Express, to be directed by Rob Reiner and to star Tom Hanks. The Polar Express, released in 2004, was ultimately directed by Robert Zemeckis. Scotch Marmo was engaged in 2005 to rewrite Bill Kelly's Enchanted. The film, which was released in 2007, was directed by Kevin Lima, and starred Amy Adams and Patrick Dempsey. In 2005-2008, Scotch Marmo worked on another unproduced project, Winged Boy, which was to have been directed by Luis Mandoki.

In 2009-2010, Scotch Marmo collaborated with leading Pakistani director Sabiha Sumar (Khamosh Pani/Silent Waters) to write a screenplay originally entitled Rafina. Set against the backdrop of the Benazir Bhutto assassination, Rafina is a young woman from the Karachi slums who dreams of becoming a model. The film was shot on location in Pakistan in 2010 with real-life model Amna Ilyas in the lead role, and released internationally in 2013 as Good Morning Karachi. Scotch Marmo also served as producer on the film.

=== 2010s ===
In 2013, Scotch Marmo returned to Hollywood and was enrolled by the Joe Roth Company and Universal Pictures, as part of a team with her former student Soman Chainani, to adapt Chainani's debut novel, The School for Good and Evil. The book is the first part of a six-book series. The School for Good and Evil is a Netflix production, to be directed by Paul Feig, and starring Charlize Theron and Kerry Washington.

Recently, Scotch Marmo completed The Murderous Life of Bruno Enzo a film loosely based on her grandfather. She is also executive producer of a compilation film of four short films written and directed by young Rwandan filmmakers.

== Academia ==
Scotch Marmo frequently teaches screenwriting at the Columbia University Graduate School of the Arts, where she has been an adjunct faculty member off and on since 2002. Scotch Marmo has also taught screenwriting at Sarah Lawrence College and La Femis in Paris. In addition to Chainani, Scotch Marmo's former students include Phil Johnston (screenwriter, Wreck-It Ralph), Jennifer Lee (screenwriter and co-director, Frozen), and Lakshmi Sundaram (television writer, Brooklyn Nine-Nine).

Scotch Marmo has frequently served as a Creative Advisor for the Sundance Institute, mentoring developing filmmakers in labs held in Provo, Utah and Mumbai, India. She has also served as a Mentor for the Maisha Film Lab, founded by Indian filmmaker Mira Nair, and worked with developing filmmakers in Kigali, Rwanda.

== Screenplays ==
- Once Around (1991)
- Hook (1991)
- Only You (uncredited) (1992)
- Jurassic Park (uncredited) (1993)
- Madeline (1998)
- The Other Sister (uncredited) (1999)
- Polar Express (uncredited) (2004)
- Enchanted (uncredited) (2007)
- Good Morning Karachi (2013)
- The School for Good and Evil (2022)
