= Demographics of Glasgow =

Demographics of the most populous city in Scotland

- Population pyramid of Glasgow
- Population: 593,245 (2011)
- Density: 3,390/km2 (8,780/sq mi).

Population density in the 2011 census in Glasgow.

Glasgow is the most populous city in Scotland and the fourth most populous city in the United Kingdom.

Industry sectors of Glasgow overtime

== Population ==
Glasgow's total population, according to the 2011 UK census, was 593,245. The population density was 3,390/km^{2} (8,780/sq mi).

== Ethnicity ==
The following table shows the ethnic group of respondents in the previous four censuses in Glasgow alongside two estimates.

A Home Office report officially estimated that the 'coloured' population of Glasgow in 1958 was likely around 3,000 to 5,000, the majority being Asian (2,000 Pakistanis and 2,000 Indians). A similar estimate was given for 1961, whereby there was 3,000 Asians within Glasgow.

Ethnic Group	1981 estimations		1991 census		2001 census		2011 census		2022 census	
Ethnic Group	Number	%	Number	%	Number	%	Number	%	Number	%
White: Total	755,125	98.1%	665,835	96.7%	546,359	94.55%	524,561	88.42%	501,029	80.71%
White: Scottish	–	–	–	–	503,614	87.15%	466,241	78.59%	416,634	67.12%
White: Other British	–	–	–	–	20,934	3.62%	24,154	4.07%	35,011	5.64%
White: Irish	–	–	–	–	11,467	1.98%	11,228	1.89%	11,130	1.79%
White: Gypsy/Traveller (Note: New category created for the 2011 census)	–	–	–	–	–	–	407	0.07%	201	0.03%
White: Polish	–	–	–	–	–	–	8,406	1.42%	12,183	1.96%
White: Other	–	–	–	–	10,344	1.79%	14,125	2.38%	25,870	4.17%
Asian, Asian Scottish or Asian British: Total	12,003		19,263		25,636	4.44%	47,758	8.05%	68,793	11.08%
Asian, Asian Scottish or Asian British: Indian	2,465		3561		4,173	0.72%	8,640	1.46%	13,990	2.25%
Asian, Asian Scottish or Asian British: Pakistani	7,015		11,605		15,330	2.65%	22,405	3.78%	30,912	4.98%
Asian, Asian Scottish or Asian British: Bangladeshi	128		197		237	0.04%	458	0.08%	954	0.15%
Asian, Asian Scottish or Asian British: Chinese	1,833		2,903		3,876	0.67%	10,689	1.80%	14,300	2.30%
Asian, Asian Scottish or Asian British: Asian Other	562		997		2,020	0.35%	5,566	0.94%	8,640	1.39%
Black, Black Scottish or Black British	–	–	–	–	1,792	0.31%	–	–	–	–
African: Total	616		750		–	–	12,440	2.10%	22,272	3.59%
African: African, African Scottish or African British	616		750		–	–	12,298	2.07%	2,798	0.45%
African: Other African	–	–	–	–	–	–	142	0.02%	19,474	3.14%
Caribbean or Black: Total	490		733		–	–	1,806	0.30%	1,471	0.24%
Caribbean	152		224		–	–	783	0.13%	335	0.05%
Black	–	–	–	–	–	–	820	0.14%	96	0.02%
Caribbean or Black: Other	338		509		–	–	203	0.03%	1,033	0.17%
Mixed or multiple ethnic groups: Total	–	–	–	–	2,046	0.35%	2,879	0.49%	10,624	1.71%
Other: Total	1,159		1,917		2,036	0.35%	3,801	0.64%	16,571	2.67%
Other: Arab	–	–	–	–	–	–	2,631	0.44%	8,671	1.40%
Other: Any other ethnic group	1,159		1,917		2,036	0.35%	1,170	0.20%	7,903	1.27%
Non-White: Total	14,269		22,665		31,510	5.45%	68,684	11.58%	119,726	19.29%
Total:	769,394	100%	688,500	100%	577,869	100%	593,245	100%	620,756	100%

Distribution of ethnic groups in Glasgow according to the 2011 census.
White

White-Scottish

White-Other British

White-Irish

White-Polish

White-Other

Asian

Asian-Indian

Asian-Pakistani

Asian-Bangladeshi

Asian-Chinese

African

Caribbean or Black

Other-Arab

== Country of Birth ==
The proportion of people residing in Glasgow born outside the UK was 19.1% in 2022, compared with 12.2% in 2011 and 5.7% in 2001. Below are the fifteen largest overseas-born groups in Glasgow according to the 2022 census, alongside the two previous censuses.

Country of birth	2022	2011	2001
Pakistan	12,508	9,319	5,995
Poland	10,601	7,577	281
India	10,212	5,789	2,364
China	7,857	5,513	730
Nigeria	5,448	2,761	199
United States	3,964	1,866	1,122
(Republic of Ireland) Ireland	3,643	4,339	5,113
Italy	3,189	1,028	674
Iran	2,647	1,136	592
Spain	2,290	722	367
Germany	2,262	1,948	1,379
Hong Kong	2,095	1,430	1,406
Iraq	2,029	1,191	750
Romania	1,830	460	43
France	1,688	1,077	701
Overall – all overseas-born	118,819	72,607	32,690

The country of birth of Glasgow for 1981 is as follows;

Country of Birth	Year	
Country of Birth	1981	
Country of Birth	Number	%
United Kingdom	728,050	96.4%
England	19,592	2.6%
Scotland	701,054	92.8%
Wales	921	
Northern Ireland	–	–
United Kingdom (not otherwise specified)	6,483	0.9%
Europe (non-UK)	12,778	1.7%
Ireland	9,341	
Other EEC	2,334	
Other Europe	1,103	
Asia and Middle East	8,286	1.1%
India	2,624	
Pakistan	3,532	
Bangladesh	152	
Far East	1,978	
Middle East	–	–
Africa	1,227	0.2%
North America	–	–
South America	–	–
Oceania	–	–
Other: New Commonwealth (Note: Used as main option for when no other options are given, for example in 1971. This group contains all for Canada, Australia and New Zealand)	356	
Other: Old Commonwealth (Note: Used as a conglomerate for New Commonwealth for when there are no other options as for example in 1971. This group contains all for remenents of the British Empire after 1945 (if not already indicated).)	1,479	0.2%
Other:	3,012	0.4%
Total	755,377	100%

== Languages ==
The languages other than English used at home in Glasgow according to the 2011 census are shown below.

Language	Usual residents aged 3+	Proportion
English only	496,027	86.62%
Gaelic	2,305	0.40%
Scots	2,826	0.49%
British Sign Language	1,717	0.30%
Polish	7,379	1.29%
Other	62,379	10.89%

== Religion ==
The following table shows the religion of respondents in the 2001, 2011 and 2022 censuses in Glasgow.

Current religion	2001		2011		2022	
Current religion	Number	%	Number	%	Number	%
Christianity	374,393	64.79%	322,954	54.44%	240,337	38.72%
–Roman Catholic	168,733	29.20%	161,685	27.25%	128,743	20.74%
–Church of Scotland	182,172	31.52%	136,889	23.07%	82,585	13.30%
–Other Christian	23,488	4.06%	24,380	4.11%	29,009	4.67%
Islam	17,792	3.08%	32,117	5.41%	48,766	7.86%
Hinduism	1,209	0.21%	4,074	0.69%	8,166	1.32%
Buddhism	1,194	0.21%	2,570	0.43%	2,854	0.46%
Sikhism	2,374	0.41%	3,149	0.53%	3,456	0.56%
Judaism	1,083	0.19%	897	0.15%	973	0.16%
Paganism (Note: New category created for the 2022 census)	—N/a	—N/a	—N/a	—N/a	2,001	0.32%
Other religion	3,799	0.66%	1,599	0.27%	1,817	0.29%
No religion	131,189	22.70%	183,835	30.99%	268,327	43.23%
Religion not stated	44,836	7.76%	42,050	7.09%	44,076	7.10%
No religion/Not stated total	176,025	30.46%	225,885	38.08%	312,403	50.33%
Total population	577,869	100.00%	593,245	100.00%	620,756	100.00%

Distribution of religions in Glasgow according to the 2011 census.
Christianity

Church of Scotland

Roman Catholic

Other Christian

Islam

Judaism

Hinduism

Sikhism

Buddhism

Other religion

No religion

== National identity ==
The 2022 census found that of the 620,756 people residing in Glasgow, 62.3% identified with the Scottish identity only, 11.8% identified with the British identity only and 7.1% identified with both identities. 2.5% identified with other UK identities (including English identity), 12.9% identified with an other identity only and the remaining 0.5% identified with at least one UK identity and an other identity.

== See also ==
- Demographics of the United Kingdom
- Demographics of Scotland
- Demographics of Edinburgh
- Demographics of London
- Demographics of Birmingham
- Demographics of Greater Manchester
- List of towns and cities in Scotland by population
- Subdivisions of Scotland
- Wards of Glasgow
