= Demographics of Edinburgh =

- Population pyramid of Edinburgh
- Population: 530,680 (2024)

The demography of Edinburgh, the capital city and second largest city of Scotland, is analysed by the National Records of Scotland. The population of the council area of Edinburgh was 530,680 in 2024.

== Population ==
=== Historical ===
Historical population
Year	Pop.	±%
1801	82,560	—
1811	102,987	+24.7%
1821	138,235	+34.2%
1831	161,909	+17.1%
1841	166,450	+2.8%
1851	193,929	+16.5%
1901	303,638	+56.6%
1911	320,318	+5.5%
1921	420,264	+31.2%
1931	439,010	+4.5%
1951	466,761	+6.3%

In the 18th and 19th centuries, the population expanded rapidly, rising from 49,000 in 1751 to 136,000 in 1831, primarily due to migration from rural areas. As the population grew, problems of overcrowding in the Old Town, particularly in the cramped tenements that lined the present day Royal Mile and the Cowgate, were exacerbated. Poor sanitary arrangements resulted in a high incidence of disease, with outbreaks of cholera occurring in 1832, 1848 and 1866.

== Ethnicity ==
Ethnic Group	1991		2001		2011		2022	
Ethnic Group	Number	%	Number	%	Number	%	Number	%
White: Total	409,044	97.64%	430,369	95.9%	437,167	91.5%	436,742	84.9%
White: Scottish	–	–	354,053	78.9%	334,987	70.2%	298,533	58.0%
White: Other British	–	–	51,407	11.4%	56,132	11.7%	69,829	13.6%
White: Irish	5,518	1.31%	6,470	1.4%	8,603	1.8%	10,326	2.0%
White: Gypsy/Traveller (Note: New category created for the 2011 census)	–	–	–	–	388	–	256	–
White: Polish	–	–	–	–	12,820	2.68%	16,351	3.18%
White: Other	–	–	18,439	4.1%	24,237	5.1%	41,449	8.1%
Asian, Asian Scottish or Asian British: Total	6,979	1.66%	11,600	2.5%	26,264	5.5%	44,070	8.6%
Asian, Asian Scottish or Asian British: Indian	1,176	0.28%	2,384	0.53%	6,470	1.35%	12,414	2.41%
Asian, Asian Scottish or Asian British: Pakistani	2,625	0.62%	3,928	0.87%	5,858	1.22%	7,454	1.45%
Asian, Asian Scottish or Asian British: Bangladeshi	328	–	636	0.14%	1,277	0.26%	2,685	0.52%
Asian, Asian Scottish or Asian British: Chinese	1,940	0.46%	3,532	0.78%	8,076	1.69%	15,076	2.93%
Asian, Asian Scottish or Asian British: Asian Other	910	0.21%	1,201	0.26%	4,583	0.96%	6,441	1.25%
Black, Black Scottish or Black British (Note: Category restructured for the 2011 census)	1,171	0.3%	1,577	0.3%	5,505	1.2%	10,881	2.1%
African: Total	603	-	1,285	0.2%	4,474	0.9%	9,462	1.84%
African: African, African Scottish or African British	603	–	1,285	0.2%	4,364	0.91%	809	0.16%
African: Other African	–	–	–	–	110	–	8,653	1.68%
Caribbean or Black: Total	568	–	292	–	1,031	0.2%	1,419	0.3%
Caribbean	175	–	292	–	505	0.1%	477	0.1%
Black	–	–	–	–	403	–	80	–
Caribbean or Black: Other	393	–	–	–	123	–	862	0.17%
Mixed or multiple ethnic groups: Total	–	–	2,776	0.6%	4,087	0.8%	12,882	2.5%
Other: Total	1,720	0.41%	2,047	0.45%	3,603	0.8%	9,966	1.9%
Other: Arab	–	–	–	–	2,500	0.52%	4,119	0.8%
Other: Any other ethnic group	1,720	0.41%	2,047	0.45%	1,103	0.23%	5,849	1.14%
Total:	418,914	100%	448,624	100%	476,626	100%	514,543	100%

== Country of birth ==
The proportion of people residing in Edinburgh born outside the UK was 23.5% in 2022, compared with 15.9% in 2011 and 8.3% in 2001. Below are the largest overseas-born groups in Edinburgh according to the 2022 census, alongside the two previous censuses.

Place of birth	2022	2011	2001
Poland	13,842	11,651	416
India	9,445	4,888	1,733
Mainland China (Note: This figure does not include Hong Kong and Macau.)	8,229	4,188	978
United States	6,539	3,715	2,184
Italy	4,885	1,716	1,257
Spain	4,837	2,011	1,058
(Republic of Ireland) Ireland	4,774	4,743	3,324
Germany	3,843	3,526	2,760
Hong Kong	3,556	1,622	1,416
Pakistan	3,220	2,472	1,663
Nigeria	2,978	1,186	231
France	2,973	2,039	1,412
South Africa	2,464	1,824	1,331
Greece	2,377	992	575
Australia	2,189	2,086	2,012
Canada	2,079	1,760	1,332
Overall – all overseas-born	120,978	75,698	37,420

== Religion ==
The following table shows the religion of respondents in the 2001, 2011 and 2022 censuses in Edinburgh.

Current religion	2001		2011		2022	
Current religion	Number	%	Number	%	Number	%
Christianity	245,876	54.81%	206,565	43.34%	154,899	30.10%
–Church of Scotland	158,305	35.29%	115,634	24.26%	69,356	13.48%
–Roman Catholic	48,712	10.86%	57,868	12.14%	51,950	10.10%
–Other Christian	38,859	8.66%	33,063	6.94%	33,593	6.53%
Islam	6,759	1.51%	12,434	2.61%	18,034	3.50%
Hinduism	1,209	0.27%	3,996	0.84%	8,459	1.64%
Buddhism	1,193	0.27%	2,380	0.50%	2,796	0.54%
Sikhism	792	0.18%	1,110	0.23%	1,395	0.27%
Judaism	774	0.17%	855	0.18%	1,270	0.25%
Paganism (Note: New category created for the 2022 census)	—N/a	—N/a	—N/a	—N/a	2,055	0.40%
Other religion	5,696	1.27%	1,864	0.39%	1,629	0.32%
No religion	163,930	36.54%	213,651	44.83%	289,944	56.35%
Religion not stated	22,395	4.99%	33,771	7.09%	34,061	6.62%
No religion/Not stated total	186,325	41.53%	247,422	51.91%	324,005	62.97%
Total population	448,624	100.00%	476,626	100.00%	514,543	100.00%

== National identity ==
The 2022 census found that of the 514,543 people residing in Edinburgh, 47.9% identified with the Scottish identity only, 16.6% identified with the British identity only and 8.9% identified with both identities. 5.0% identified with other UK identities (including English identity), 16.5% identified with an other identity only and the final 0.9% identified with at least one UK identity and an other identity.

== See also ==
- Demographics of Glasgow
- Demographics of Scotland
- Subdivisions of Scotland
