= Ae Fond Kiss ... (film) =

2004 film

Ae Fond Kiss…
- Theatrical release poster
- Directed by: Ken Loach
- Written by: Paul Laverty
- Produced by: Rebecca O'Brien
- Starring: Atta Yaqub; Eva Birthistle
- Cinematography: Barry Ackroyd
- Edited by: Jonathan Morris
- Music by: George Fenton
- Distributed by: Icon Film Distribution
- Release dates: 13 February 2004; (Germany); 17 September 2004 (United Kingdom)
- Running time: 104 minutes
- Countries: United Kingdom; Belgium; Germany; Italy; Spain
- Languages: English; Punjabi
- Budget: £3 million

Ae Fond Kiss... is a 2004 romantic drama film directed by Ken Loach, and starring Atta Yaqub and Eva Birthistle. The film explores the complications that ensue when Casim, a second-generation Scottish Pakistani, falls in love with Roisin, an Irish Catholic immigrant. The title is taken from a song by Robert Burns, the full line being "Ae [one] fond kiss and then we sever".

== Plot ==
The Khan family are originally from Pakistan but have lived in the UK for forty years. Tariq and Sadia live in Glasgow with three children: the eldest daughter, Rukhsana, lives strictly according to the family's Muslim faith and is also ready to enter into the marriage with Amar planned by her parents; she studied and may soon marry Amar, who has a Ph.D. Their only son, Casim, is also a qualified accountant, but earns his living as a DJ and hopes to open his own nightclub with his friend Hammid. His parents have planned for him to marry his cousin Jasmine, which will take place in a few weeks. According to his wishes, Casim will continue to live with the family thereafter; his father plans to enlarge his house with an extension with rooms for the future family. The youngest daughter, Tahara, is still at school but dreams of studying journalism. Rukhsana, Casim and Tahara try to slowly separate from the influence of their parents.

One day, Tahara is bullied at school by her peers, she angrily chases them throughout school. Casim rushes after her and everyone ends up in the music room of Roisin Hanlon, who gives singing lessons. A guitar breaks in the chaos. The next day, Casim brings Roisin a new guitar and takes Roisin home, where she has to hide in the car from people who might know Casim. Then he arranges for her to transport her piano with friends and finally invites her to go out with him. At the disco, Casim sees his little sister, is upset and sends her home. Casim and Roisin meet up in their apartment and spend the night together.

Roisin, who previously worked part-time as a music teacher at the Catholic school, is offered a full-time position. She could start after the summer holidays and would only have to present a certificate from her parish priest. Roisin, in a good mood, unexpectedly offers Casim a holiday for several days in Spain. He lies to his family that he has to go to work in London. The days in Spain are harmonious and full of love, but Casim admits to Roisin that according to his parents' wishes, he must marry his cousin. Roisin is hurt because she thinks he only saw her as an adventure. Casim puts forward his feelings for Roisin and decides to cancel the planned wedding, even if it endangers the peace of the family. Back in Glasgow, Rukhsana tells him that she is engaged to Amar. Casim confides in his friend Hammid, who advises him against starting a relationship with Roisin because it would destroy his family. Casim breaks up with Roisin.

Soon after, Casim discovers how his father forbids Tahara from studying journalism at Edinburgh because she is supposed to study in Glasgow like her siblings. Casim half-heartedly takes his parents' side and is called a hypocrite by Tahara. When the latter leaves, Casim takes her side and tells his mother that he will not marry. The same day, he leaves his parents' apartment and moves in with Hammid. He later meets Roisin by chance in a cafe, but she avoids him. She later finds out from Tahara that Casim will not marry and has moved away. She resumes her relationship with him and they now live together.

Shortly before the start of the school year, Roisin wishes to obtain a certificate from the parish priest. The priest refuses because he has learned that Roisin lives with a Muslim and has sexual relations with him outside of marriage. Since Roisin is not divorced, she is still considered a wife by the Catholic Church. She is angry at the priest's narrow-mindedness, but gets the full-time position without explanation, because the warden considers her love life a private matter. Meanwhile, the Khan family and the community have learned about Casim's relationship with Roisin. They view family honour as destroyed, leading, among other things, to Amar's family breaking off the engagement. Rukhsana visits Roisin and asks her to leave Casim, which she refuses. Roisin is informed that she is being transferred to a non-denominational school with immediate effect by the school authorities.

When Casim cannot stay with her due to work commitments, she locks him out of their apartment. The next day, Casim tries in vain to contact her by telephone. His mother trying to contact him, and having briefly had Tahara on the line, he drives to his parents' house. Meanwhile, Rukhsana asks Roisin to get into her car because she wants to show her something. She takes them to the family home. There, Roisin sees Casim introduced to a young woman. This is Jasmine, who has arrived in Glasgow. Rukhsana reports to Roisin that the engagement was never broken and Roisin runs away in despair. Casim is outraged that his parents never informed Jasmine's family of his decision and now want to force them to marry. Tahara manages to warn Casim of Roisin's presence and he rushes after her. Tahara now also has the courage to insist on studying in Edinburgh with her father.

Casim searches for Roisin all day and finally finds her at home. She fears he will pack his bags, but he makes her understand that he will stay - until old age.

== Cast ==
- Atta Yaqub ... Casim Khan
- Eva Birthistle ... Roisin Hanlon
- Ahmad Riaz ... Tariq Khan
- Shamshad Akhtar ... Sadia Khan
- Shabana Akhtar Bakhsh ... Tahara Khan
- Ghizala Avan ... Rukhsana Khan

== Reception ==
On the review aggregator Rotten Tomatoes, Ae Fond Kiss received a rating of 88%, certifying it as "Fresh", based upon 25 reviews. On Metacritic, the film had an average score of 65 out of 100, based on 7 reviews, indicating "generally favorable" reviews.

== Accolades ==
Ae Fond Kiss received a number of nominations and awards.

=== 2004 ===
- Won, Berlin International Film Festival – Prize of the Ecumenical Jury
- Won: Berlin International Film Festival – Prize of the Guild of German Art House Cinemas
- Nominated: Berlin International Film Festival – Golden Bear for Best Motion Picture
- Nominated: British Independent Film Awards – Best Actress (Eva Birthistle), Best Screenplay (Paul Laverty), Most Promising Newcomer (Atta Yaqub)
- Nominated: International Filmfest Emden – Emden Film Award
- Won: European Film Awards – Best Screenwriter (Paul Laverty)
- Won: Irish Film and Television Awards – IFTA Award for Best Actress (Eva Birthistle)
- Won: Valladolid International Film Festival – Audience Award
- Won: Valladolid International Film Festival – Golden Spike Award
- Won: Motovun Film Festival – Propeller of Motovun

=== 2005 ===
- Won: London Film Critics Circle – ALFS Award for Best Actress of the Year (Eva Birthistle)
- Won: César Award – Best European Union Film (Meilleur film de l'Union Européenne)

== See also ==
- Asian-Scots
- British Pakistanis
- New Scot
