= Scottish Asians =

Racial or ethnic group in Scotland with Asian ancestry

Total population
- 212,022 – 3.9% (2022 Census): Pakistani – 72,871 – 1.3%; Indian – 52,951 – 1.0%; Chinese – 47,075 – 0.9%; Bangladeshi – 6,934 – 0.1%; Other Asian – 32,187 – 0.6%

Regions with significant populations
- Glasgow City: 68,793 – 11.1%
- City of Edinburgh: 44,070 – 8.6%
- Aberdeen City: 13,091 – 5.8%
- East Renfrewshire: 9,156 – 9.5%

Languages
- British English · Asian languages

Related ethnic groups
- British Asians

Scottish Asian (Asian-Scottish or Asian-Scots) is a term defined within the 2011 Scottish census as including people of Bangladeshi, Chinese, Indian, Pakistani or other Asian ancestry resident in Scotland. Their parents or grandparents are normally Asian immigrants. It can also refer to people who are of dual Scottish and Asian ancestry. It combines Asian ethnic background with Scottish national identity.

In traditional British usage, the term Asian did not normally include East Asians, who were referred by their respective national origins (e.g. Chinese, Japanese and others) or collectively as "Oriental", which similar to Scotch can be viewed of as pejorative when applied to people. By contrast, in traditional North American usage the term Asian did not normally include South Asians but focused on East and Southeast Asians, particularly Chinese, Japanese and Vietnamese. These frames of reference reflect different migration patterns.

== Demographics ==
Historical Population
| Year | Pop. | ±% |
|---|---|---|
| 1991 | 47,456 | — |
| 2001 | 71,317 | +50.3% |
| 2011 | 140,678 | +97.3% |
| 2022 | 212,022 | +50.7% |
Source: National Records of Scotland

The 1991, 2001, 2011 and 2022 censuses recorded the following ethnic groups:

| Ethnic Group | 1991 | | 2001 | | 2011 | | 2022 | |
| Ethnic Group | Number | % | Number | % | Number | % | Number | % |
|---|---|---|---|---|---|---|---|---|
| Asian, Asian Scottish or Asian British: Indian | 10,050 | 0.20% | 15,037 | 0.30% | 32,706 | 0.62% | 52,951 | 0.97% |
| Asian, Asian Scottish or Asian British: Pakistani | 21,192 | 0.42% | 31,793 | 0.63% | 49,381 | 0.93% | 72,871 | 1.34% |
| Asian, Asian Scottish or Asian British: Bangladeshi | 1,134 | 0.02% | 1,981 | 0.04% | 3,788 | 0.07% | 6,934 | 0.13% |
| Asian, Asian Scottish or Asian British: Chinese | 10,476 | 0.21% | 16,310 | 0.32% | 33,706 | 0.64% | 47,075 | 0.87% |
| Asian, Asian Scottish or Asian British: Asian Other | 4,604 | 0.09% | 6,196 | 0.12% | 21,097 | 0.40% | 32,187 | 0.59% |
| Asian, Asian Scottish or Asian British: Total | 47,456 | 0.95% | 71,317 | 1.41% | 140,678 | 2.66% | 212,022 | 3.90% |
| Total Population in Scotland | 4,998,567 | 100% | 5,062,011 | 100% | 5,295,403 | 100% | 5,439,842 | 100% |

=== 2011 census ===
In addition to ethnicity, the 2011 census asked about national identity.

- 34 per cent of all minority ethnic groups felt they had some Scottish identity either on its own or in combination with another identity. This ranged from 60 per cent for people from a mixed background and 50 per cent for those from a Pakistani ethnic group, to 21 per cent for those from an African ethnic group. This compared to 83 per cent for all people in Scotland.
- 62 per cent of the total population stated ‘Scottish identity only’ as their national identity, of which 98 per cent stated their ethnicity as ‘White: Scottish’.
- 18 per cent of the total population stated ‘Scottish and British identity only’ as their national identity, of which 97 per cent stated their ethnicity as ‘White: Scottish’.
- 8 per cent of the total population stated their national identity as ‘British identity only’. Of these, 49 per cent stated their ethnicity as ‘White: Scottish’, 38 per cent were ‘White: Other British’, and 8 per cent were ‘Asian’.
- 4 per cent of the total population stated their national identity as ‘Other identity only’ (i.e. no UK identity), 32 per cent of those were ‘White: Other White’, 22 per cent were ‘Asian’ and 21 per cent were ‘White: Polish’.

== South Asian communities ==
Map of Glasgow, coloured according to % of residents stated as Asian in the 2011 UK Census.

Scotland's South Asian population of more than 80,000 is mostly from Indian and Pakistani background. The majority are adherents of the Hindu, Sikh and Islamic faiths and are concentrated around urban areas, such as Greater Glasgow, Edinburgh and Dundee. However, there are Asian communities in places as small as Stornoway and as far north as Aberdeen.

- Dundee - 4,000 Asians (especially the Hilltown and Stobswell)
- Edinburgh - 26,264 Asians
- Glasgow (and surrounding Greater Glasgow area) - 65,000 Asians (especially Pollokshields, Pollokshaws, Govanhill, Newton Mearns, Bearsden, East Kilbride and Woodlands)

== Notable Scottish Asians ==
=== Arts and entertainment ===
- Ali Abbasi, media presenter and writer
- Danny Bhoy, comedian
- Shabana Bakhsh, actress
- Serena Dalrymple
- Hassan Ghani, journalist and broadcaster
- Mahtab Hussain, photographer
- Sara Ishaq, film maker
- Sanjeev Kohli, actor and TV presenter
- Hardeep Singh Kohli, disgraced media presenter
- Katie Leung, actress
- MC-VA, rapper
- Aasmah Mir, television and radio presenter
- Shereen Nanjiani, television and radio presenter
- Suhayl Saadi, writer
- Kiran Sonia Sawar, actress
- Marli Siu, actress
- KT Tunstall, musician
- Atta Yaqub, actor and model

=== Business ===
- Poonam Gupta, businesswoman
- Angela Malik, chef and entrepreneur
- Tony Singh, chef and entrepreneur

=== Politics ===
- Bashir Ahmad - first MSP to be elected from an Asian background. Member of the SNP
- Mushtaq Ahmad - Lord Provost of South Lanarkshire
- Irshad Ahmed - Labour MSP for Edinburgh and Lothians East.
- Tasmina Ahmed-Sheikh - former SNP MP for Ochil and South Perthshire
- Foysol Choudhury - Labour MSP for Lothian region. First MSP of Bangladeshi descent
- Zen Ghani - SNP MSP for Glasgow Cathcart and Pollok.
- Pam Gosal - Conservative MSP for West Scotland region. First female MSP of Indian descent
- Ayesha Hazarika - Labour political advisor
- Simita Kumar - SNP MSP for Edinburgh South Western region.
- Bashir Maan - former Labour councillor
- Hanzala Malik - former Labour MSP for the Glasgow region; the first Scottish Asian MSP from the Scottish Labour party
- Nosheena Mobarik - (Conservative member of the House of Lords; former MEP for Scotland)
- Claude Moraes - former Labour MEP for London
- Anum Qaisar-Javed - Former SNP MP for Airdrie and Shotts (2021–24)
- Jainti Dass Saggar - first non-White local authority councillor in Scotland
- Anas Sarwar - former Leader of the Scottish Labour Party (2021-2026), first ethnic minority to be leader of a Scottish political party. Member of the House of Lords (2026–present); MSP for Glasgow region (2016–2026); former Labour MP for Glasgow Central (2010-2015)
- Mohammed Sarwar - former Labour MP for Glasgow Central (1997-2010), father of Anas Sarwar.
- Kaukab Stewart - Former SNP MSP for Glasgow Kelvin (2021-2026). First MSP female of colour elected
- Yi-pei Chou Turvey - Liberal Democrat MSP for the North East Scotland region.
- Humza Yousaf - Former First Minister of Scotland (2023-2024) and SNP MSP for Glasgow Pollok (2016-2026).

=== Sport ===
- Aqeel Ahmed, boxer
- Tanveer Ahmed, boxer
- Jamie Bhatti, rugby union player
- Asim Butt, cricketer
- David Changleng, rugby union player and referee
- Malcolm Changleng, rugby union player and referee
- Ukashir Farooq, boxer
- Majid Haq, cricketer
- Omer Hussain, cricketer
- Moneeb Iqbal, cricketer
- Jazz Juttla, former footballer
- Vishal Marwaha, hockey player
- Rashid Sarwar, former footballer
- Safyaan Sharif, cricketer
- Qasim Sheikh, cricketer

=== Other ===
- Mohammed Atif Siddique, convicted of terrorism offences
- Mamta Singhal, winner of the Women Engineering Society Prize - Young Women Engineer of the Year 2007; finalist for Global MBA student of the Year 2008

== Popular culture ==
- Ae Fond Kiss... (film on New Scots)
- Bo Kata
- Bombay Talkie
- Nina's Heavenly Delights

== See also ==
- Demographics of Scotland
- Buddhism in Scotland
- Hinduism in Scotland
- Islam in Scotland
- Sikhism in Scotland
- Scottish people
- British Asian
- New Scot
