= Black Scots =

Black Scottish may refer to:

- Anglo-Métis, Canadian children of fur traders, who had Anglo fathers and Canadian first nation non african/black mothers
- Black Scottish people, who represent approximately 0.7 percent of the total population of Scotland
