= Madan Gopal Singh =

Indian screenwriter

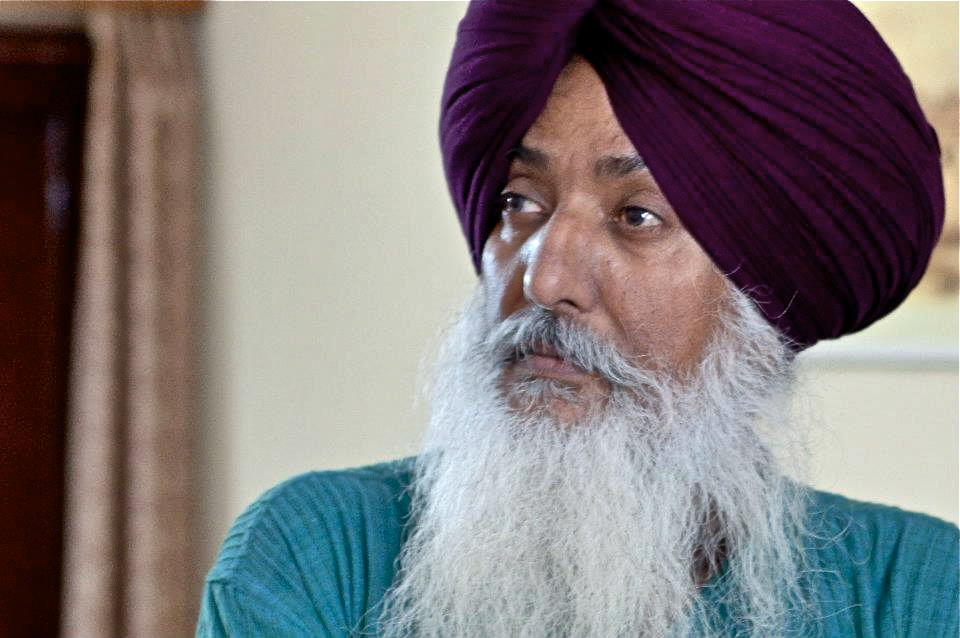
Madan Gopal Singh

Madan Gopal Singh is an Indian composer, singer, lyricist, actor, screenwriter, film theorist, editor and polyglot. He is currently Senior Fellow at the Nehru Memorial Museum and Library, New Delhi while on leave from Satyawati College (Evening Classes), where he taught English literature. Son of well-known Punjabi poet Harbhajan Singh, Madan Gopal Singh has written and lectured extensively on cinema, art and cultural history besides performing the world over as a singer with his ensemble Chaar yaar.

== Writing ==
Madan Gopal Singh wrote dialogues and lyrics for critically acclaimed Punjabi film Qissa by Anup Singh. Singh is a scriptwriter, having written films like Rasayatra on the well-known Hindustani classical vocalist Mallikarjun Mansur – a film that won the National Award for the best short film in 1995. The film was directed by Nandan Kudhyadi. He wrote the screenplay (jointly with the director of the film, Anup Singh), dialogues and lyrics for a feature-length film, Ekti Nadir Naam (English: The Name of a River), based on the life of the late Ritwik Kumar Ghatak. The film won the G. Aravindan Award, and the Silver Dhow at the Zanzibar International Film Festival 2002.

He also wrote the Toona adaptation from Baba Bulle Shah which was rendered by Shubha Mudgal for Mira Nair's Kama Sutra: A Tale of Love, and he wrote dialogues for Kaya Taran, a film based on the 1984 anti-Sikh riots. The film was directed by Sashi Kumar and won the G Arvindan Award 2004.

He wrote lyrics for the Aman Ali Ayan Ali album of lounge music, Truth, produced by Times Music, 2007 and for Ustad Amjad Ali Khan's compositions sung by Pankaj Udhaas, Yaara produced by Music Today October 2007.

== Music ==
Madan Gopal Singh has composed and sung the poetry of Rumi, Shah Husain, Sultan Bahu and Bulle Shah and has also translated contemporary poets such as Bertolt Brecht, Federico García Lorca and even John Lennon especially his Imagine which he translated into Hindustani – and sung them extensively. He has sung for films like Kumar Shahani's Kasba and Khayal Gatha and Mani Kaul's Idiot. As a singer, he travelled with the legendary Kurdo-Persian singer Shahram Nazeri to ancient Sufi towns such as Isfahan, Hamadan and Kermanshah. He also performed at the 2nd Sufi Soul World Music Festival held in Lahore, Pakistan in 2001.

Singh was invited to the Smithsonian Folklife Festival 2002, Washington as a presenter-performer. In all, he gave/made/conducted 28 concerts, presentations and workshops. He composed music for the documentary film on Kashmir- Paradise on a River of Hell directed by Meenu Gaur and Abir Bazaz.

He also composed music for Sabiha Sumar's celebrated Khamosh Pani – a French-German-Pakistan coproduction that won the Best Film award at the Locarno Film Festival, 2003.

A CD of live recording of his music titled Concert for Noor was produced in 2012 by the Noor Inayat Memorial Trust (UK).

He composed music for Fana'a – Ranjha Revisited – a musical by Navtej Johar showcased at various places world over.

He composed music for Beyond Partition – a film by Lalit Joshi, South Asian Cinema Foundation, London.

Among other places he has performed at the Town Hall Festival, Bari, Italy; Experimenta 2005, Alberobello, Italy; World Sufi Spirit Festival in the Ahhichatragarh Fort Nagaur, in February 2013; the Bonn Biennale, 2006 where he appeared as the main chorus in two performances of Agra Bazaar directed by Habib Tanvir; the Other Festival held in Chennai in December 2006 and the Festival of India, Brussels in 2007.
