= Good Morning Karachi =

- Theatrical release poster
- Directed by: Sabiha Sumar
- Written by: Malia Scotch Marmo, Sabiha Sumar, and Samhita Arni
- Based on: Rafina by Shandana Minhas
- Produced by: Sachithanandam Sathananthan
- Starring: Amna Ilyas; Beo Rana Zafar; Saba Hameed; Atta Yaqub; Aamina Sheikh; Savera Nadeem; Yasir Aqueel; Khalid Malik; Shaheen Khan; Farhan Ally Agha; Faisal Qureshi; Zoe Viccaji
- Production company: Vidhi Films
- Distributed by: A-Plus Films; Footprint Entertainment
- Release dates: 9 November 2013 (SAIFF); 1 January 2015 (Pakistan)
- Running time: 96 minutes
- Country: Pakistan
- Languages: Urdu, English
- Box office: Rs. 4.5 million (US$16,000)

Good Morning Karachi (formerly Rafina) is a 2013 Pakistani drama film directed by Sabiha Sumar and produced by Sachithanandam Sathananthan under the banner Vidhi Films. The film is written by Malia Scotch Marmo, Sumar and Samhita Arni, based on the novel Rafina by the acclaimed Pakistani writer Shandana Minhas.

== Synopsis ==
It is the story of a young girl, Rafina, (Amna Ilyas) who chases her dream to become a renowned model.

== Cast ==
- Amna Ilyas as Rafina
- Beo Zafar as Rosie
- Saba Hameed as Rafina's mother
- Atta Yaqub as Jamal
- Aamina Sheikh as Mehwish (card girl)
- Savera Nadeem as PJ
- Yasir Aqueel as Arid
- Faiza Syed as Nausheen
- Khalid Malik as Murad
- Shaheen Khan as Nawal
- Farhan Ali Agha as Fahad
- Faisal Qureshi
- Abdullah Akram (Qatar)
- Zoe Viccaji as Salon Bride

== Release ==
An early version of Good Morning Karachi was presented in 2013 in India at the 15th Mumbai Film Festival, in Sweden at the Goteborg International Film Festival, and in the United States at the 3rd i South Asian Film Festival in San Francisco and the South Asian International Film Festival in New York. On 14 June 2014, the completed film screened at the London Asian Film Festival. Good Morning Karachi had its Karachi premiere on 28 December 2014 where Saba Hameed, Savera Nadeem, Amina Sheikh and Yasir Aqil along with other showbiz stars attended the premiere. The film was released in cinemas across Pakistan by A-Plus Films on 1 January 2015. Good Morning Karachi was released on video in the North America and most European territories on 12 January 2015.

== Critical reception ==
Jennie Kermode of Eye for Film gave Good Morning Karachi 3 1/2 of 5 stars, saying "the story benefits from a fairly nuanced script, with even the traditionalist fiance allowed to be sympathetic on occasion." Dr. Joy Browne gave the film the same rating on her weekly radio show.

The Daily Times wrote, "The film looks at the culture of violence in Pakistan and how youth are most affected by this environment. It shows how new industries, such as media and fashion, have democratised spaces in urban Pakistan. It has provided new opportunities for young people and given hope to the next generation. This can pave the way for a new, modern and tolerant society. Young women like Rafina are the embodiment of this hope for the future."

Hale Syed of DAWN.com rated the film 3 out of 5 and wrote "The Cinderella story is not new, but has had more distinctive retellings. More fleshed out characters and better pacing could have kept the movie from feeling predictable and obvious."

Shafiq ul Hasan of The Express Tribune rated the film 2.5/5 and wrote "Good Morning Karachi, for Pakistani cinema, is amongst the few unconventional, path-breaking movies. The reason is very simple; Good Morning Karachi is a female-oriented film with a female protagonist. Unfortunately, except for this bit, there is little else that is extraordinary about this film."

== See also ==
- List of highest-grossing Pakistani films
- List of Pakistani films of 2013
