= Maryfield Hospital =

- NHS Tayside
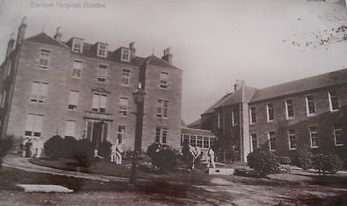
- Maryfield Hospital

- Shown in Dundee

Geography
- Location: Dundee, Scotland, United Kingdom
- Coordinates: 56°28′33″N 2°57′37″W

Organisation
- Care system: Public NHS
- Type: General

History
- Founded: 1893
- Closed: 1976

Links
- Lists: Hospitals in Scotland

Maryfield Hospital was a hospital in Stobswell, Dundee, Scotland. Originally a poorhouse hospital it became Dundee's second main hospital after Dundee Royal Infirmary. It closed in the 1970s following the opening of Ninewells Hospital.

== History ==
Maryfield Hospital's origins can be traced to a poor hospital built in 1893 at the East Poorhouse, Dundee. The East Poorhouse had been built by the Parochial Board of Dundee in 1856 to the south of Clepington Road.

The hospital was run by Parochial Board (later known as Dundee Parish Council) as the Eastern Hospital. Following the abolition of parish councils in Scotland in 1929, control passed to Dundee Town Council, under whose stewardship the hospital began to focus on the fields of maternity and childcare as Maryfield Hospital.

Dr Jainti Dass Saggar played a key role in modernising the hospital via the provision of electro-cardiograms, bronchoscopes, and high-powered X-ray machines.

From 1948, it came under the control of the National Health Service and along with other local hospitals was run by Dundee General Hospitals Board of Management. It eventually expanded to cover all of the site formerly occupied by the East Poorhouse. As a result, it became Dundee's second main hospital.

From the late 1940s a number of senior doctors were transferred from Dundee Royal Infirmary to Maryfield to develop the hospital, including Jean Herring, a protégée of Margaret Fairlie, who became consultant in charge of the Gynaecology Department in 1949.

A new geriatric unit was opened at the hospital by Princess Margaret in 1957.

Maryfield was also the site of a pioneering general hospital psychiatric unit, under the medical direction of Sir Ivor Batchelor. In 1959 the psychiatric wards were amalgamated with Dundee District Asylum and Dundee Royal Asylum at Liff to form the combined Dundee Royal Mental Hospital at Liff.

In the 1960s a world record was set at the hospital when a patient named Angus Barbieri spent 382 days between June 1965 and July 1966 without taking solid food. Barbieri survived by taking tea, coffee and soda water as well as vitamins. During that period, his weight declined from 214 to 80.74 kilograms (33 st 9.8 lb to 12 st 10.0 lb; 471.8 to 178.0 lb).

Maryfield was used by the Medical School at University College Dundee, initially part of the University of St Andrews and later the University of Dundee. Professors Sir Ian Hill and Sir Donald Douglas secured building space at the hospital and Dundee Royal Infirmary for their famed research and clinical investigation into circulatory diseases and cardiology.

Maryfield closed in stages between 1974 and 1976 following the opening of the larger and more modern Ninewells Hospital. This came after some debate. There was an urgent need for better facilities for the teaching of medicine at Queen's College, Dundee and this required improvements be made to either Maryfield or Dundee Royal Infirmary (DRI) along with the building of a new hospital. In 1960 a plan was approved to spend up to £800,000 redeveloping Maryfield by 1970, which assumed that it would be DRI that would close when Ninewells opened. However, after much debate this plan was scrapped and it was decided to retain DRI and close Maryfield. After the removal of the last patients, some of the buildings were retained by Tayside Health Board for use as administrative accommodation.

== Legacy ==
The archives of the hospital are held as part of the NHS Tayside archives at Archive Services, University of Dundee.

== See also ==
- Oswald Taylor Brown
