= Black Scottish identity =

Objective or subjective state of perceiving oneself as a black Scottish person

Black Scottish identity is the objective or subjective state of perceiving oneself as a black Scottish person and as relating to being black Scottish. The identity has been researched academically, particularly within the arts, as well as social sciences, and has been reported on and discussed in the media of Scotland.

== Background ==
Black Scottish identity has been researched and reported on within a range of contexts and intersecting dimensions. The identity is usually connected with black African and African Caribbean heritage or cultural association in Scotland, and academic research in social sciences has focused on perceptions of competing identities:

To some, it’s obvious that the two are not mutually exclusive. To others, Black Scottish identity is a contradiction in terms: either you’re of this place, Scottish and therefore white, or Other, Black.

In scholarly publications with a focus on literary works, the writings of Maud Sulter, and Jackie Kay in particular, have produced study into the subject in Scotland. Kay's work and commentary is preeminent in the portrayal of black Scottishness and identity. Academics, such as professor Alan Rice, have analyzed how the writer's 1998 novel Trumpet harnessed African-American music and traditions in order to explore black Scottish identity.

== History ==
In 2013, Scottish playwright David Greig, who was brought up in Nigeria, wrote that increased awareness of black Scottish identity was a positive result of the policy and cultural debates ahead of the 2014 Scottish independence referendum.

A 2017 study into Scottish Somalis living in Glasgow detailed how monolithic black identity in Scotland had created cultural identification issues. University of Edinburgh research-fellow Emma Hill's analysis detailed the potential conflicts created by the identity and its tendency to exclude the group's religious faith as Muslims. Queen Margaret University's Dr Rebecca Finkel, Dr Briony Sharp and Dr Majella Sweeney explored the identity and its ethnocultural expression in Scottish society in their 2018 Routledge research-series.

== Academic research ==
The works of Jackie Kay have been widely examined in the emergence of a black Scottish identity in the nation. Carole Seymour-Jones's 2009 Disappearing Men, which analyzes Kay's black character (Joss Moody) in Trumpet, argues that black Scottish identity is a form of inclusive declaration which defies oversimplified categorisation. University of Zadar assistant professor, Vesna Ukić Košta, has written of black Scottish identity, examining another Kay work (The Adoption Papers) and its intersection with parent-child relations.

Dr Minna Liinpää's 2018 Nationalism from Above and Below, published by the University of Glasgow, examined nationalism and racialised society in Scotland. The thesis, which studied the experiences of black Scots, analyzed perceptions of contradiction between blackness and Scottishness. In Gerry Hassan's 2019 Scotland the Brave? Twenty Years of Change and Devolution, University of Edinburgh professor Dr Nasar Meer explores the political challenges for ethnic minorities, and specifically black Scottish people, in expressing their Scottish national identity. Dr Francesca Sobande and Layla-Roxanne Hill's 2022 Black Oot Here: Black Lives in Scotland, published by Bloomsbury focuses on a wide range of experiences of education, work, activism, media, creativity, public life, and politics, to present a vital contemporary account of Black lives in Scotland.
