= Rashid Sarwar =

Scottish footballer

Personal information
- Date of birth: 3 March 1965 (age 61)
- Place of birth: Paisley, Scotland
- Position: Winger

Youth career
- 1994–1997: Pollok St Conval's

Senior career*
Years	Team	Apps	(Gls)
1984–1987	Kilmarnock	24	(1)
- Maryhill
- Glenafton Athletic
- Largs Thistle
- * Club domestic league appearances and goals

Rashid Sarwar (born 3 March 1965) is a Scottish former footballer who played for Kilmarnock. He is of Pakistani descent. Although his career at senior level was short and unremarkable, he is notable as one of very few Asian-Scots to have been involved in professional football even to that extent.

== Career ==
Born in Paisley, Scotland to Pakistani parents, Sarwar was signed for Kilmarnock by manager Eddie Morrison, who is said to have struggled with the spelling of his new recruit's personal details on the contract – including the local birthplace.

He made his competitive debut in May 1985 in a 4–1 defeat to Airdrieonians at Rugby Park, his only appearance that season. In the next campaign, 1985–86, he made 19 league starts plus one in the Scottish Cup, also scoring what proved to be his only goal in a 4–2 win over Brechin City. His final game was in August 1986, a 3–1 loss to Forfar Athletic.

Having failed to keep his place in the Kilmarnock squad, Sarwar moved on to the Junior grade with Maryhill. He later played for Ayrshire teams Glenafton Athletic and Largs Thistle (where he also served as a coach, and encountered racist abuse from supporters of opposing team Dalry in 2001).

== See also ==
- British Asians in association football
