= Wayne Rigby =

British former boxer (born 1973)

Personal information
- Nationality: British
- Born: 19 July 1973 (age 53) Manchester, England
- Height: 5 ft 6 in (1.68 m)
- Weight: Lightweight, super lightweight

Boxing career
- Reach: 68 in (170 cm)

Boxing record
- Total fights: 31
- Wins: 20
- Win by KO: 9
- Losses: 11

Wayne Rigby (born 19 July 1973) is a British former boxer who was British lightweight champion in 1998. He later moved up to super lightweight and won the WBF world title.

== Career ==
Born in Manchester, Wayne Rigby began his professional career in 1992. After winning ten of his first thirteen fights he beat Jimmy Phelan in September 1996 to take the BBBofC Central Area lightweight title. In January 1998 he faced Tanveer Ahmed for the vacant British title, winning on points. He made a successful defence of the British title in April 1998 against Matt Brown, but lost it six months later when he was stopped in the tenth round by Bobby Vanzie.

In May 2000 he beat Dariusz Snarski to take the IBO Inter-Continental lightweight title, setting him up to challenge for Michael Ayers' world title in July; Ayers stopped him in the tenth round to retain the title. In March 2001 he again challenged for Ayers' title, this time losing on points.

Rigby moved up to super lightweight to challenge for Antonio Ramirez's World Boxing Federation World title in November 2001; Rigby took a unanimous decision to become world champion. He made a successful defence against Sedat Puskullu in March 2002, knocking the challenger out in the first round. Two months later he dropped back down to lightweight to challenge for Colin Dunne's WBU World title; Rigby retired after the tenth round. He made a second defence of his World super lightweight title in November 2002, losing on points to the undefeated Gary Ryder.

After 18 months out of the ring he returned in May 2004 to challenge for Tony Montana's BBBofC Central Area super lightweight title, losing on points. His lost his fourth consecutive fight in October 2004, to Roger Sampson, and retired from boxing the following month.
