= Bombay Talkie (band) =

Scottish Bhangra band

Bombay Talkie was a Bhangra band of the 1990s, from Glasgow, Scotland. The group were best known for their hit, "Charigue" (but spelt Chargiye on their Judgement Day CD), which is still included on many Bhangra compilation albums.

The band featured in the BBC Television documentary The Spice Boys – a reference to the Spice Girls, who had also risen to prominence at the time – and played at the T in the Park music festival plus toured Malaysia.

== Members ==
Members of Bombay Talkie have included:

- Sanjay Majhu (lead vocals)
- Charan Gill (lead vocals)
- Bindi Bhumbra (guitars, production, composition)
- Rakesh Rakhra (keyboards, production, composition)
- Kamal Jandoo (bass guitar)
- Karmjit Nandha (dholaks)
- Jojo Singh (dhol)
- Affy Ahmad (drums)
- Parminder Sumal (congas, bongos)

== Discography ==
=== Albums ===
- Judgement Day (1993)
- Feem (1995)

== See also ==
- Asian-Scots
