= Oswald Taylor Brown =

Scottish physician

- Born: Oswald Taylor Brown; 11 October 1916
- Died: 26 March 2006 (aged 89)
- Military career
- Allegiance: United Kingdom
- Branch: Royal Air Force
- Service years: 1939–1946
- Rank: Squadron Leader
- Nickname: Ossie
- Service number: 100467
- Conflicts: World War II
- Awards: Mentioned in Despatches (3); OBE
- Other work: Geriatrician

Oswald Taylor Brown OBE, FRCP(Glasg), FRCP(Ed) (11 October 1916 – 26 March 2006) was a Scottish consultant physician in geriatric medicine based in Dundee from 1951 until 1979. He is recognised as an early architect of geriatric care services in Scotland.

== Background ==
Oswald Taylor Brown was educated at Glasgow High School and Strathallan School in Perthshire. He graduated from the University of Glasgow in the summer of 1939 with a degree in medicine. At the outbreak of the Second World War he volunteered to join the Royal Air Force with whom he attained the rank of squadron leader. He crossed over to France with the invasion forces on D Day + 6 and served there and in Germany until the end of the war in 1945. Oswald Taylor Brown was mentioned in despatches on three separate occasions.

== Career ==
After Oswald Taylor Brown had been demobilised in 1946 he returned to Glasgow and joined the unit of Professor Noah Morris where he developed his interest in the new speciality of geriatrics. Morris foresaw that demographic changes made it inevitable that competently organised and led services for an ageing population would soon be required. Morris sent Brown to meet Dr Marjory Warren at the West Middlesex University Hospital, whose pioneering work impressed him and he decided that geriatrics would become his speciality. On return to Glasgow he was appointed assistant physician at the Southern General Hospital with the task of setting up a new 'geriatric service'.

In 1951 he was appointed the first consultant physician in geriatric medicine in Scotland, serving Tayside, Perth and Angus. Further posts would be created throughout Scotland in the 1950s. The new service was based at Maryfield Hospital but was soon expanded to hospitals throughout Tayside. The service was based on a combination of acute admission and rehabilitation units, supported by adequate beds for long-term care. The effective treatment of tuberculosis with Streptomycin freed many beds and he often acknowledged the significant contribution that this made to the expansion of the service.

Oswald Taylor Brown opened the first university department of geriatric medicine in Scotland. His expertise was recognised when he was appointed honorary senior lecturer in the Faculty of Medicine at the University of St. Andrews. He was also a founding member of the British Geriatric Society.

== Awards ==
- Appointed an Officer of the Most Excellent Order of the British Empire in 1969.
