= Fresh Talent Initiative =

The Fresh Talent Initiative was a Scottish Government policy framework to encourage people to settle in Scotland. The initiative was launched in February 2004 by then First Minister, Jack McConnell as a way of countering the 'biggest challenge facing Scotland' of its falling population.

Since immigration is a matter reserved to the UK parliament in the legislation that established the Scottish Parliament in 1999 (the Scotland Act 1998), agreement had to be obtained from the Home Office for a key part of the initiative: to allow overseas graduates from Scottish universities, who express the intention of living and working in Scotland, to stay on for two years following graduation to seek employment. The Fresh Talent: Working in Scotland Scheme was up and running by summer 2005, applying to those who graduated that year.

Opposition towards the scheme was voiced by some English universities which felt that the scheme gave Scottish universities a competitive advantage in terms of attracting students from overseas.

The Fresh Talent: Working in Scotland Scheme was subsumed into the UK immigration system on 29 June 2008 when the UK government brought in a new points based immigration scheme.

== See also ==
- Demographics of Scotland
- New Scot
- TalentScotland
