= Once Around =

1991 film by Lasse Hallström

- Theatrical release poster
- Directed by: Lasse Hallström
- Written by: Malia Scotch Marmo
- Produced by: Amy Robinson; Griffin Dunne
- Starring: Richard Dreyfuss; Holly Hunter; Danny Aiello; Laura San Giacomo; Gena Rowlands
- Cinematography: Theo van de Sande
- Edited by: Andrew Mondshein
- Music by: James Horner
- Production companies: Cinecom Entertainment Group; Double Play Productions; Dreyfuss/James Productions
- Distributed by: Universal Pictures
- Release date: January 18, 1991
- Running time: 115 minutes
- Country: United States
- Language: English
- Budget: $16 million
- Box office: $14,851,083

Once Around is a 1991 American romantic comedy-drama film about a young woman who falls for and eventually marries an overbearing older man who proceeds to rub her close-knit family the wrong way, while exposing the dynamics of other family members along the way. It stars Richard Dreyfuss, Holly Hunter, Danny Aiello, Laura San Giacomo and Gena Rowlands and was written by Malia Scotch Marmo and directed by Swedish director Lasse Hallström, in his full English-language film debut.

== Plot ==
The Bellas are a close-knit family of Italian-Americans living in Boston, Massachusetts. Joe, the head of the family, owns a construction company. He has been married to Marilyn for 34 years and they have three children—Renata, Tony and Jan. Jan (the youngest) is about to get married, leading introverted Renata (the eldest and only one not married) to wonder why her boyfriend Rob has not yet proposed to her. Once Rob reveals that he never plans on marrying her, she leaves him and moves back in with her parents.

Renata travels to the Caribbean, where she takes a course on selling condominiums. She meets Sam Sharpe, a highly successful Lithuanian-American salesman who makes a speech at a training seminar. They are instantly attracted to each other, and Sam accompanies her back to Boston, where Renata introduces him to her family. The chain-smoking, abrasive Sam is overly eager to please. While the majority of the Bellas give Sam a chance, Jan seems to have a particular dislike of him. This upsets Renata and the siblings' rapport becomes strained. Jan eventually apologizes and gives Renata her blessing.

Sam and Renata get married, with Sam relocating his business from New York to Boston so he can spend as much time with Renata as possible. At a memorial for Joe's late mother, Sam attempts to sing a song in her honor, but the Bellas, especially Marilyn, tell him it is highly inappropriate. Renata tells Sam he is tearing her family apart. They reconcile, and the next day Renata gives birth to their daughter. At the baptism, Sam suffers a heart attack and is rushed to the hospital.

Now in a wheelchair, Sam is welcomed home to the Bella residence to celebrate Christmas as a family. During dinner, he lights up a cigarette, which an irritated Renata throws into a glass of wine. On a frozen lake, Renata goes skating, while Sam and their daughter watch from a distance. Sam passes away while still holding his child. After the funeral, Renata mourns, but is grateful for the time they had together and for Sam changing her life for the better. Joe directs the funeral procession through several rotations on a traffic round-about, something Sam learned from his father-in-law and greatly enjoyed during his life.

== Cast ==
- Richard Dreyfuss as Sam Sharpe
- Holly Hunter as Renata Bella
- Danny Aiello as Joe Bella
- Laura San Giacomo as Jan Bella
- Gena Rowlands as Marilyn Bella
- Roxanne Hart as Gail Bella
- Danton Stone as Tony Bella
- Tim Guinee as Peter Hedges
- Greg Germann as Jim Redstone
- Griffin Dunne as Rob
- Cullen O. Johnson as Sonny
- Glenn Russell Turk as Wedding Band Drummer
- Sal Ruffino as Wedding Guest

== Soundtrack ==
James Horner wrote the musical score for this film. The film features "Fly Me to the Moon" as its main song.

== Reception ==
The movie gained mixed-to-positive reviews from critics. The film holds a 67% "Fresh" score on Rotten Tomatoes based on 21 critics.

Several details of Lithuanian-American culture are present in the film, such as the folk dance in the wedding party, the folksong about motherhood, and the priest performing the baptism of the newborn child.
