= Motia Sarkar =

Pakistani television series

- Urdu: موتیا سرکار
- Genre: Period drama
- Written by: Kaleem Kazmi
- Directed by: Seema Taher Khan
- Starring: Muneeb Butt; Amna Ilyas
- Country of origin: Pakistan
- Original language: Urdu
- No. of episodes: 2

Production
- Executive producer: Seema Taher Khan
- Producer: Anjum Ansari
- Production company: STK Productions

Original release
- Network: TV One Pakistan
- Release: 7 August – 21 August 2023

Motia Sarkar is Pakistani television series first broadcast on TV One on 7 August 2023. It starred Muneeb Butt and Amna Ilyas. Set in the 1970s–1980s in the red light area of Lahore, the series is about the journey of a young man named Motia to spirituality from being a pimp.

== Plot ==
Motia Sarkar is set in the 1970s–80s in the red light district of Lahore. Motia, a young man, resides in this area where his mother and sister are both tawaifs.

Motia's life changes when his aunt's daughter Chambeli comes to live in his house after her mother's death. He becomes a great friend and grows attached to her. Motia's mother teaches Chambeli dance and music as a tawaif and sends her to school as well. However, when a tawaif of another kotha offers her to pay any amount for Chambeli, she agrees. Chambeli is then sent to her kotha which devastates Motia, as she was his only friend.

== Cast ==
- Muneeb Butt as Motia
- Amna Ilyas as Chambeli
- Ayesha Gul as Gulshan Bai
- Saima Qureshi as Aasha Bai
- Farrukh Darbar as Rozi
- Hamza Khan as Naveed

== Production ==
On 14 July 2023, Muneeb Butt revealed his look from his upcoming project Motia Sarkar for which he goes under complete look transformation. He revealed to DAWN Images that he will portray a pimp from the red light area and the series is about his journey towards the spiritualism.
