= Navtej Johar =

Indian choreographer (born 1959)

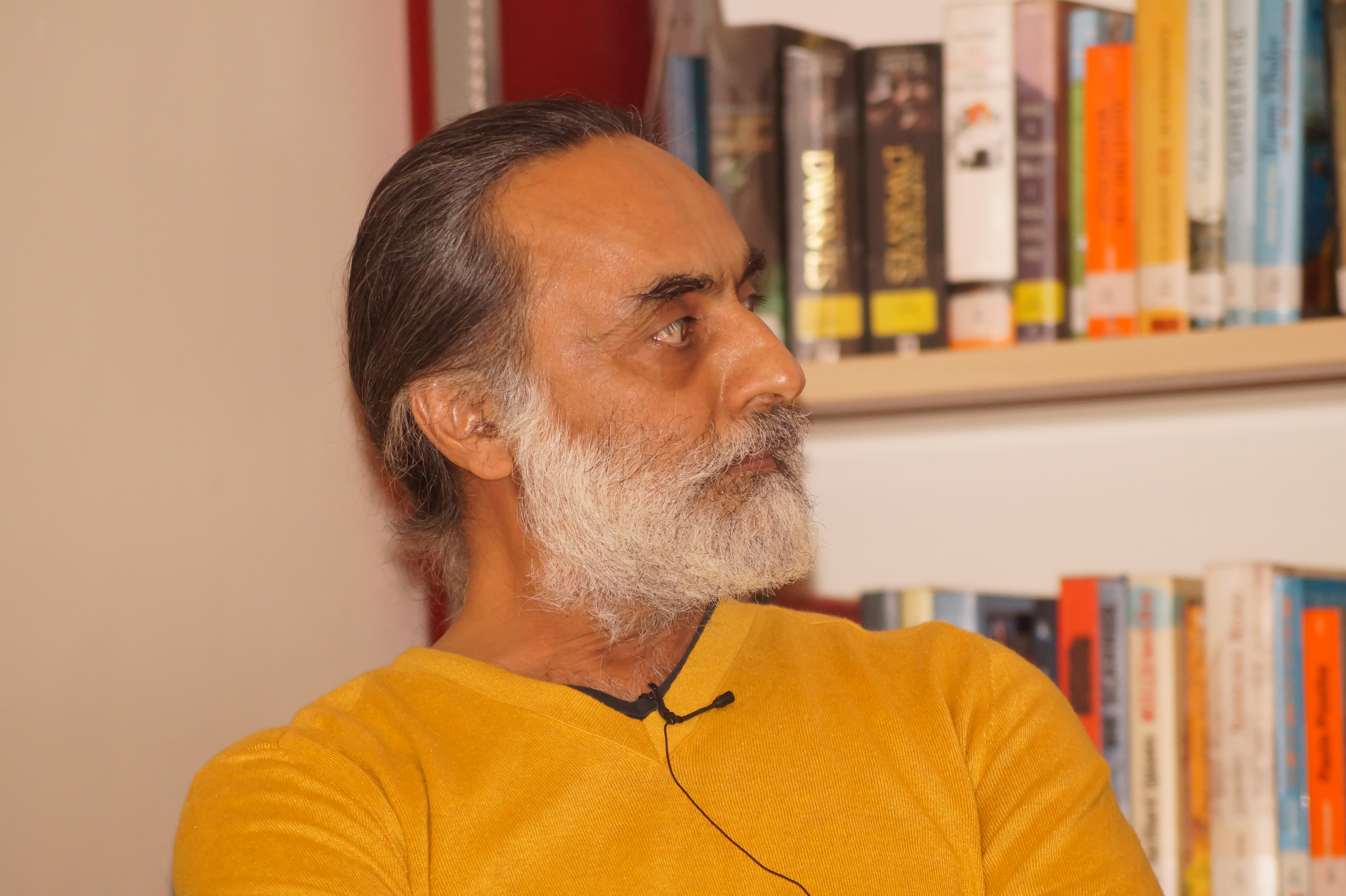
- Navtej Johar at Delhi QueerFest 2016
- Born: 8 August 1959 (age 66); Jalandhar, Punjab, India
- Occupations: Dancer, Choreographer, Yoga Instructor
- Known for: Navtej Singh Johar v. Union of India
- Website: navtejjohar.com

Navtej Singh Johar (born 8 August 1959) is an Indian Sangeet Natak Akademi award-winning Bharatnatyam exponent and choreographer. He is also an LGBTQ activist.

== Life and career ==
Johar is faculty at Ashoka University, Sonipat. He is trained in Bharatanatyam at Kalakshetra, a dance school of Rukmini Arundale at Chennai, and with Leela Samson at the Shriram Bharatiya Kala Kendra in New Delhi. He also studied later at the Department of Performance Studies, New York University. He has received numerous fellowships for his research such as the Times of India Fellowship (1995), and the Charles Wallace Fellowship (1999).

Johar has collaborated with composers Stephen Rush, Shubha Mudgal and installation artist Sheba Chhachhi among others. He has also acted in Earth by Deepa Mehta and Khamosh Pani by Sabiha Sumar.

He is among the few male dancers of classical form in India and first Sikh to have taken to the art form.

=== Activism ===
In June 2016, Johar and five others, belonging to sexual and gender minority community, filed a writ petition in the Supreme Court of India challenging Section 377 of the Indian Penal Code. This resulted in the 2018 landmark judgment in Navtej Singh Johar v. Union of India in which the Supreme Court unanimously declared the law unconstitutional "in so far as it criminalizes consensual sexual conduct between adults of the same sex".
