= Atta Yaqub =

Scottish model and actor

- Born: 1979 (age 46–47); Glasgow, Scotland
- Education: IT management
- Alma mater: University of Strathclyde
- Occupations: Actor, model
- Years active: 2004– present
- Known for: Ae Fond Kiss...

Atta Yaqub (born 1979) is a Scottish model and actor. He played the lead role in the 2004 film Ae Fond Kiss....

== Career ==
Yaqub was born in Glasgow to Pakistani parents in 1979. Yaqub began modelling as a young adult. He appeared in ads for The Royal Bank of Scotland and Cruise. He made his acting debut in Ken Loach's film Ae Fond Kiss where he played a Pakistani Muslim man who falls in love with an Irish Catholic woman. For his role he was nominated for a British Independent Film Award for Best Newcomer.

He featured in Running in Traffic and Nina's Heavenly Delights. In 2011 he entered international cinema with the German film Fernes Land (Junction Point) and Sabiha Sumar's Rafina. In 2012 he joined the cast of the BBC Three drama Lip Service.

== Personal life ==
Yaqub has a degree in IT management and also works as a counselor, advising drug addicts. He is a representative for the Goethe-Institut. He goes to schools around Scotland to promote the Show Racism The Red Card programme. He was also involved in the "One Scotland, Many Cultures" anti-racism campaign. Yaqub speaks English and Punjabi fluently as well as some Urdu and German. Yaqub was educated at Shawlands Academy, Glasgow.

In 2009, Yaqub criticised Prince Harry for making what he saw as prejudiced comments about Pakistanis and asked for a personal apology.

== Filmography ==
Year	Film	Role	Notes
2004	Ae Fond Kiss...	Casim Khan	
2004	Doctors	Madhav Verma	"Party Games"
2005	The Camping Trip	Sunny	
2005	Meet the Magoons	Suky Riprah	"Stairway to Havan"
2005	Perfect Day	Ash	
2005	Pakistani Actually	Himself	Documentary
2006	New Street Law	Nadeem Rashid	Season 1, Episode 5
2006	Explosions	Hassans	
2006	Nina's Heavenly Delights	Kary Shah	
2007	Karachi Uncovered	Himself	BBC documentary
2009	Running in Traffic	Amman	
2011	Fernes Land	Haroon	German-language film
2012	Lip Service		Season 2
2015	Good Morning Karachi	Jamal	
2017	T2 Trainspotting	Medical student	
