= Harbhajan Singh (poet) =

Indian poet and critic (1920–2002)

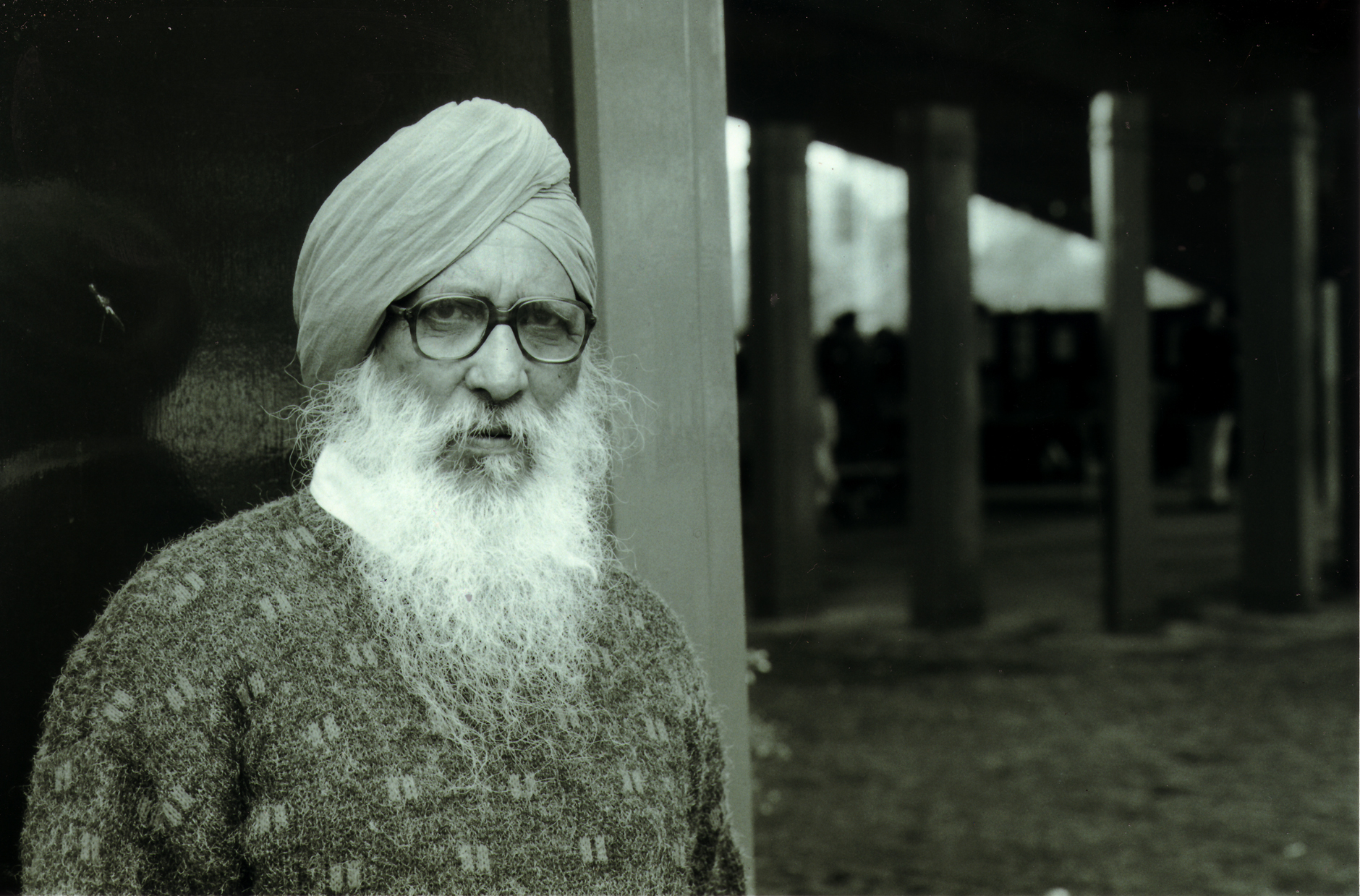
- Born: 8 August 1920; Lumding, Assam Province, British India
- Died: 21 October 2002 (aged 82)
- Occupations: Poet, critic, cultural commentator, translator

Harbhajan Singh (8 August 1920 – 21 October 2002) was an Indian poet, critic, cultural commentator, and translator in the Punjabi-language. Along with Amrita Pritam, Harbhajan is credited with revolutionising the Punjabi poetry writing style. He published 17 collections of poems, including Registan Vich Lakarhara, 19 works of literary history and translated 14 pieces of literature of others including those of Aristotle, Sophocles, Rabindranath Tagore and selections from the Rig Veda.

== Early life and education ==
Harbhajan Singh was born in Lumding, Assam, on 8 August 1920 to Ganga Devi and Ganda Singh, his father, who was suffering from tuberculosis. The family had to move to Lahore where they bought two houses in Gawalmandi. His father died before he was one year old. Then his mother and two sisters died leaving him without a direct family by the time he was 4 years of age. He was brought up by his mother's younger sister who lived in Ichhra, Lahore. He was educated in the local DAV School and was a top student from a very early age. In his educational ventures, he was among the top three in Punjab but had to stop his studies for lack of money. He took up odd jobs as a sales-boy at a Homoepathic Chemist Shop in Lahore, as a lower-division clerk with the Government of India in New Delhi and then as an Assistant Librarian in Khalsa School, New Delhi.

Singh completed his higher education without going to college, he had two degrees in English and Hindi Literature, both from the University of Delhi. His PhD thesis discussed Hindi poetry in the Gurumukhi script.

One of his three sons Madan Gopal Singh is a well-known singer and scholar.

== Career ==
He started his academic career as an English teacher before switching to Hindi and then to Punjabi. He worked at the University of Delhi as Professor Emeritus until he retired in 1984. He visited and gave lectures at many prestigious universities and institutions including the Indian Institute of Technology, Guru Nanak Dev University, Punjab University, Jammu University and Gauhati University.

He was invited to join the Department of Modern Indian Languages by a Board of anthropologists and linguists, including Professor Pritam Singh, who Singh supported greatly until his death.

== Influences ==
He praised Ustad Reham Din, Lala Suraj Bhan, Dr Mohan Singh Diwana, and Dr Nagendra as his most preferred teachers throughout his education. The poets he most admired and rated highest were Guru Nanak Dev, Guru Arjan Dev, Shah Hussain, Waris Shah, Bulle Shah, Mir Taqi Mir, Lorca, Rabindranath Tagore, Noon Meem Rashid, and Puran Singh.

Many prolific poets and scholars did their PhDs under him, including Attar Singh, Tirlok Singh Kanwar, Atamjit Singh, Mohinder Kaur Gill and Satinder Singh.

== Honours ==
- 1969: Sahitya Akademi Award, Sahitya Akademi, India, for Na Dhuppe Na ਛਾਂਵੇਂ
- 1987: Kabir Samman – one of the highest literary honours in India given by the Madhya Pradesh Government.
- 1994: Saraswati Samman – award for literary excellence in India, in
- 1994: Sahitya Akademi Fellowship, New Delhi – a title only one other Punjabi writer received; Sardar Gurbax Singh Preet Lari.
- Soviet Land Nehru Award – a now extinct award highly coveted while it existed
- 2002: Dhaliwal Sanmaan – the highest award presented to him by the Punjabi Sahitya Akademi, Ludhiana

== Bibliography ==
- A Light Within: Selected Poems of Harbhajan Singh, tr. by S. C. Narula, Sahitya Akademi, 1998. ISBN 81-260-0540-8.
- The Spirit of Khalsa – Three centuries of Interface, 2000.
- Sheikh Farid (Hindi). Hind Pocket Books, 2002. ISBN 81-216-0255-6.
- Bulleshah (Hindi). Hind Pocket Books, 2003. ISBN 81-216-0152-5.

== Works in translation ==
- Ni Chhiyan Ni Tavaro (Rajasthani), tr. by Chandra Prakash Deval. Sahitya Akademi, 1997. ISBN 81-260-0304-9.
- Punjabni Lokakatha (Gujarati), National Book Trust, 2000. ISBN 81-237-3279-1.
