= Amna Ilyas =

Pakistani actress and model

- آمنہ الیاس
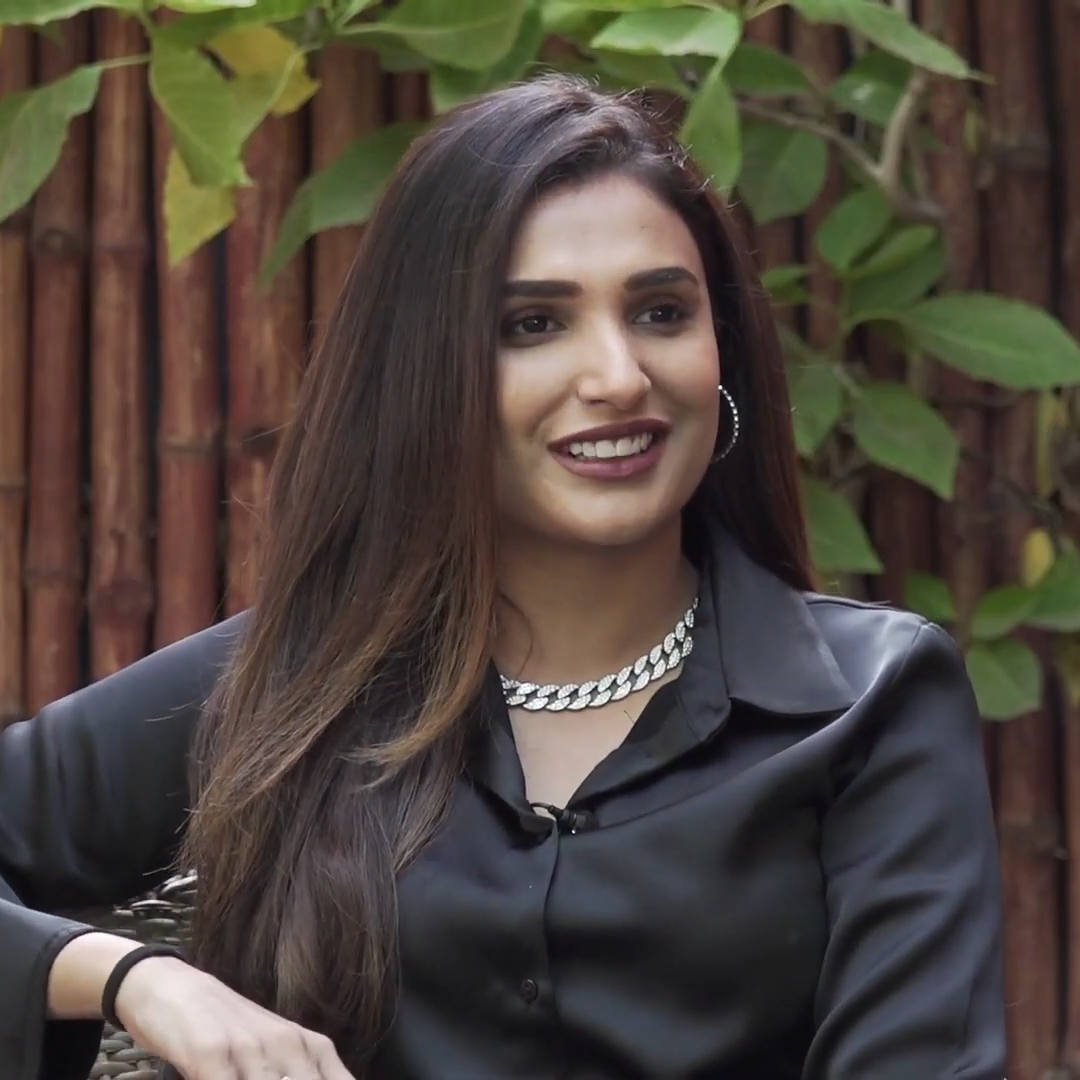
- Ilyas in 2023
- Born: 11 October 1990 (age 36); Karachi, Sindh, Pakistan
- Occupations: Actress, model
- Years active: 2007–present
- Height: 177 cm (5 ft 10 in)

Amna Ilyas (Urdu: آمنہ الیاس) (born 1990) is a Pakistani actress and model. Amna began her modeling career at the age of twenty, and a few years later, she moved on to acting in 2013. She is known for her leading roles in several films, including Zinda Bhaag (2013), Good Morning Karachi (2014), Saat Din Mohabbat In (2018), Baaji (2019), and Ready Steady No (2019). Ilyas has also starred in a series of television shows including the romantic drama Tum Mere Paas Raho (2015).

== Early life ==
Amna Ilyas was born in Karachi in 1990, and began her modeling career in 2007. Her older sisters, Salma and Uzma, are also models. She began to pursue acting in 2013.

== Career ==
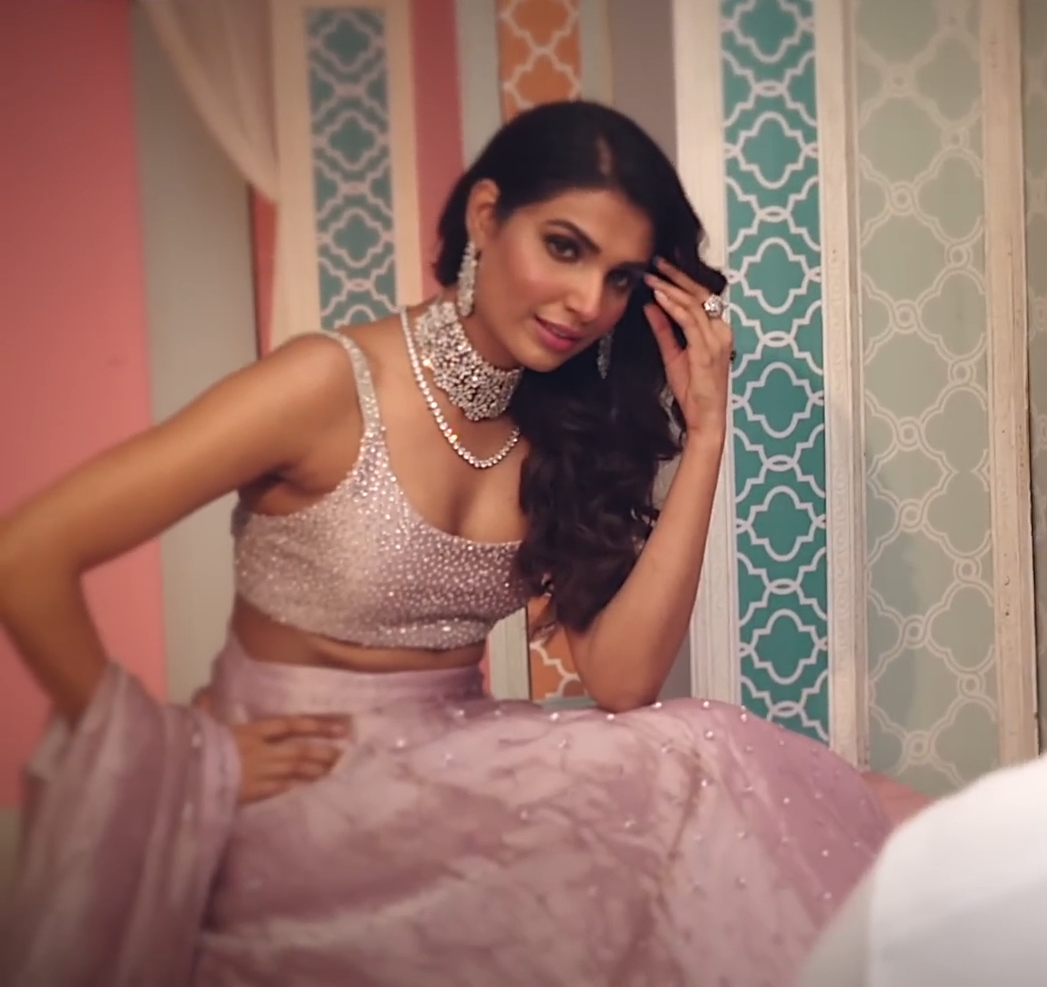
Ilyas in 2019

In 2011 and 2012, she was nominated for Model of the Year (Female) at the 11th and 12th Lux Style Awards and won the Best Dressed Female Award at the 11th Lux Style Awards and Best Female Model at the 14th Lux Style Awards. Ilyas made her film debut with a leading role in the 2013 Meenu Gaur and Farjad Nabi co-direction crime drama Zinda Bhaag alongside Naseeruddin Shah and Khurram Patras. The film proved to be a commercial success and super hit at the box-office Pakistan, earning her wide recognition and several awards and nominations in the Best Female Debut and Best Actress category (including Lux Style Awards). The following year, she appeared in the critically and commercially successful Sabiha Sumar drama film Good Morning Karachi. That same year, she featured in an item song "Kaala Doriya" for the Asad ul Haq romantic comedy Dekh Magar Pyar Se.

In 2015, Ilyas had various projects at different stage productions. She acted in Michael Hudson's action crime drama film Driven, which revolves around the elite class of Pakistan, and almost entirely filmed in a vintage Mercedes W126 S-Class from 1978, along with Javed Sheikh. She was also the female lead in the romantic comedy Gardaab, alongside Fawad Khan.

In 2018, Amna was slated to star in Saqib Malik's debut film Baaji. Filming began in the summer of 2018, and it was released the following summer in 2019. The film was considered incredibly bold by audiences and garnered critical praise nationwide. Ilyas played the role of Neha, a middle-class girl with big aspirations who suddenly becomes embroiled in the life of a veteran film star, played by Meera. The film was a commercial success. In July 2019, her film Ready, Steady, No! debuted in theaters across Pakistan in which she played the lead female. Directed by Hisham Bin Munaver, the film held a lot of witty humor and kept audiences in fits of laughter. The plot revolves around two star crossed lovers who decide to elope after being told they can't marry one another. Ilyas's character Raziya, was praised for her playful expressions and stunts.

== Filmography ==
=== Film ===
Year	Film	Role	Notes	Ref.
2013	Zinda Bhaag	Rubina	ARY Film Award for Best Actress Jury; Nominated–ARY Film Award for Best Debut Female; Nominated–Lux Style Award for Best Actress; Nominated–ARY Film Award for Best Actress	
2015	Dekh Magar Pyar Se	Item girl	Special appearance in song "Kaala Doriya"	
2015	Good Morning Karachi	Rafina		
2016	Gardaab	Parveen		
2017	Mehrunisa V Lub U	Item girl	Special appearance in song "Marhaba"	
2018	Saat Din Mohabbat In	Ghazala		
2019	Ready Steady No	Raziya		
2019	Baaji	Neha		
2023	Gunjal	Mehar		
2024	Hum Tum Aur Woo			
2024	Mastaani	Aliya		
TBA	Driven	Sobia Kazim	Unreleased	

=== Television series ===
Year	Serial	Role	Notes	Ref.
2014	Janam Jali	Samia	Hum TV	
2014	Dil Nahi Manta	Suhaina	Ary Digital	
2014	Veet Miss Super Model	Judge	Hum Sitaray	
2015	Tum Mere Paas Raho	Mariam	Hum TV	
2017	Kaffara	Arfa	A-Plus Entertainment	
2019	Jhanka Taaki	Roma	ARY Digital	
2021	Ek Jhoota Lafz Mohabbat	Aleeza	Express Entertainment	
2023	Motia Sarkar	Chambeli	TV One	
2023	Bandish 2	Wania	ARY Digital	
2023	Daurr	Hina	Green Entertainment	
2024	Akeli	Ujala	Aur Life	
2025	Humraaz	Samia	Geo Entertainment	

=== Music video appearances ===
Year	Video	Singer(s)	Notes	Ref.
2014	"Yeh Jo Halka Halka Suroor Hai"	Farhan Saeed		
2016	"Aye Khuda"	Asaad Riaz	With Emmad Irfani	

== Accolades ==
Year	Ceremony	Category	Recipient	Result	Ref.
2009	8th Lux Style Awards	Best Emerging Talent in Fashion	Amna Ilyas	Nominated	
2012	11th Lux Style Awards	Best Model of the Year (Female)	Amna Ilyas	Nominated	
2013	12th Lux Style Awards	Best Model of the Year (Female)	Amna Ilyas	Nominated	
2014	13th Lux Style Awards	Best Film Actress	Zinda Bhaag	Nominated	
2014	13th Lux Style Awards	Best Model of the Year (Female)	Amna Ilyas	Nominated	
2015	14th Lux Style Awards	Best Model of the Year (Female)	Amna Ilyas	Won	
2019	18th Lux Style Awards	Best Film Actress	Baaji	Nominated	
