= Azmaish: A Journey Through the Subcontinent =

- Film poster
- Directed by: Sabiha Sumar
- Produced by: Sathananthan Sachithanandam
- Starring: Sabiha Sumar; Kalki Koechlin
- Cinematography: Claire Pijman; Peter Brugman; Mo Azmi
- Edited by: Martin Hoffmann
- Music by: Aamir Zaki
- Production company: Vidhi Films
- Release date: 9 August 2017; (Locarno Festival)
- Running time: 85 minutes
- Countries: Pakistan; India
- Languages: Hindi, Urdu, English
- Budget: US$240,000

Azmaish: A Journey Through the Subcontinent, alternatively known as Azmaish: Trials of Life is a 2017 independent documentary film directed by Sabiha Sumar. A Pakistani-Indian co-production, it was produced by Sathananthan Sachithanandam of the Vidhi Films, and follows Sumar and Kalki Koechlin's journey through various parts of India and Pakistan, and their exploration of the relations between the two countries and their contemporary political and sociocultural scenarios.

Sumar wanted to make a film on the changing sociocultural situation of the subcontinent since 2013. Her initial idea was selected for European Broadcasting Union's 2015 Eurovision Documentary Group Meeting. The film attracted further investors in form of European television networks and pre-production work began in January 2016 when Koechlin visited Pakistan, having been invited by Sumar to work on the project. Filming for Azmaish was done in various parts of India and Pakistan in separate schedules, with Claire Pijman, Peter Brugman, Asad Faruqi, and Mo Azmi working as the directors of photography.

The film was stalled for a brief period in 2016 as the producers faced financial problems during post-production. Sumar organised two separate crowdfunding campaigns to raise money for the film's production budget, which was estimated at US$240,000. Azmaish was edited by Martin Hoffmann and its final cut ran for a total of 85 minutes. The film's music and background score was composed by Aamir Zaki.

Azmaish had its world premiere on 9 August 2017 at the Locarno Festival in Switzerland. It was also screened at other such film festivals as the Toronto International Film Festival and the BFI London. The production received generally favourable reviews from film critics and the festival audience. Azmaish was released under the label of Vidhi Films; it was made available in DVD format in May 2018 and released on the website of the non-profit organisation Women Make Movies.

== Synopsis ==
The film features Sumar and Kalki Koechlin and chronicles the journey undertaken by the duo through various parts of India and Pakistan. The duo explores the complex relations between India and Pakistan; they also interview politicians and civilians on both the countries in order to make sense of the contemporary political and sociocultural scenario.

== Cast ==
- Sabiha Sumar
- Kalki Koechlin

== Production ==
=== Development ===
"This film is about two women [...] who go on an extraordinary journey across India and Pakistan to understand why people in our countries are turning to religious extremism for answers [and] explores these questions through the lives of ordinary people. Kalki and I travel far and wide, meeting people from all walks of life, trying to understand the pulse of our countries."

— Sabiha Sumar in 2016

Sabiha Sumar first thought of making a documentary on the changing sociocultural scenarios in Pakistan and India in 2013 as she wanted to "explore both countries and catch what is going on [sic]". She was particularly intrigued by the religious extremism in the sub continent and its impact on the public mindset. Sumar felt that a documentary was the best medium for tackling the subject as it "needed real people talking about real life experiences"; according to her, a fictionalised account of things would not have been as powerful as the real life accounts. The idea did not materialise until 2015, when it was selected for the European Broadcasting Union's Eurovision Documentary Group Meeting. With the backing of the commissioning editors and professionals from the Union, Sumar was able to find investors for the project: the French-German networks Zweites Deutsches Fernsehen and Arte, and the Danish Broadcasting Corporation.

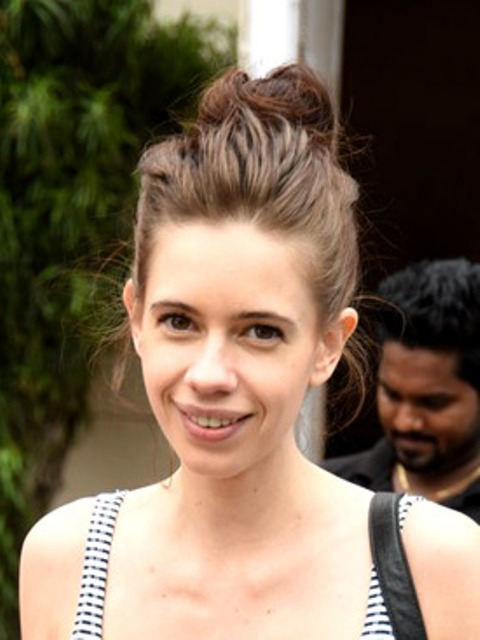
Koechlin (pictured, 2016) agreed to the project after meeting Sumar at the 2015 Mumbai Film Festival.

Sumar met Kalki Koechlin at the 2015 Mumbai Film Festival, where she was serving as the member of jury. She was looking for someone to collaborate with and felt that Koechlin "shared a similar level of curiosity". Sumar felt that it would be interesting to have for someone from India visit and explore Pakistan. Koechlin, for her part, was initially sceptic about the project as she felt that a journalist or research scholar would better suffice the demands of the documentary. She agreed to the film nonetheless as she was intrigued by documentary's subject matter. Pre-production work began in January 2016, when Koechlin visited Pakistan. Photographs of her visiting Pakistani politician Sharmila Farooqi in Karachi drew media attention and led to speculations regarding the purpose of her visit. It was only when a large part of the film's Pakistan segment was filmed that Sumar formally announced the project through an interview with the Mumbai Mirror; she also discussed the problems of funding the production and asked people to support the project's crowdfunding campaign.

=== Filming and post-production ===
Filming for Azmaish took place in varied locations in India and Pakistan including Mumbai, Delhi, Karachi, Lahore, and parts of Haryana and Sindh, with Claire Pijman, Peter Brugman, Asad Faruqi, and Mo Azmi working as the directors of photography. While Sumar narrowed down the cities that she wanted to visit in Pakistan, Koechlin chose the Indian locales; they were assisted by a research team. Koechlin travelled to Pakistan for the first filming schedule in January 2016; the production team shot in the "deserts and mountains" in Sindh, Karachi and Islamabad during the period. Koechlin recalled the day that the crew shot at a truck depot in Mauripur in an interview with Rajeev Masand: "people talked very openly [and there] was no animosity. We had chai with the Pathan drivers there. I had a great time." The crew organised a fashion show at the depot, with models wearing dresses designed by Sanam Agha and Adnan Pardesi. Koechlin and Sumar talked to the models, the designers, and the truck drivers to get an insight into the "contradictions of modern Pakistan that coexist".

Other parts of the film were shot in India in a separate schedule. The crew visited Mumbai, Maharashtra where they filmed sections of the film in the local trains and celebrated the Hindu festival of Holi with the locals in the city. The remaining parts of the documentary were shot in the North Indian states of Delhi and Haryana. Sumar said that she never worked with a definitive story and had to improvise at numerous occasions when the team could not get permissions to shoot at planned locations. Azmaish was stalled for a brief period after the filming was completed. Having self-funded the project, with assistance from the European television networks, Sumar exhausted the film's initial budget of approximately US$200,000 during the filming process. Sumar said that she was pleased with the film's rough cut and felt that the "material [was] very rich". She also expressed her desire to have the film broadcast on European television networks and have a wide release in both India and Pakistan.

Azmaish had to rely on separate crowdfunding campaigns to meet the production costs. After an unsuccessful attempt at financing the project through a campaign on the American crowdfunding website Indiegogo, which raised a sum of US$8,393 of the required US$70,000, Sumar opened another similar operation on the Mumbai-based platform Wishberry and was able to raise ₹2 million (US$21,000) for post-production. Around 60% of the total money raised was contributed by people from India and Pakistan; the producers used social media and email marketing to encourage people to contribute to the campaign. Sumar told a Wishberry executive that she chose crowdfunding as the film "deals with something that is affecting every life in these two countries [...] when we ran out of funds and channels to get these funds from, it only made sense that we reach out to the people who this film is about". Azmaish was edited by Martin Hoffmann and the sound mixing was done by Faiz Zaidi and Bhabani Mallik; the film's final cut ran for a total of 85 minutes. The film's music and background score was composed by Aamir Zaki.

== Release ==
A one and a half minute teaser was released on 9 June 2016 on the official YouTube channel of Vidhi Films as a part of the promotions for the production's crowdfunding campaign. Azmaish: A Journey Through the Subcontinent premiered, as one of the official selections, at the 70th Locarno International Film Festival on 9 August 2017. The following month, the film had its North American premiere at the Toronto International Film Festival. It was also screened at other such film festivals in 2017 as the BFI London and the Filmfest Hamburg. Azmaish was also supported by Women Make Movies, a New York-based non-profit organisation which supports independent projects by women filmmakers; it was made available in DVD format for American audiences on the platform's website in May 2018. The film was otherwise released under the label of Sumar and Sathananthan Sachithanandam's production and distribution house, Vidhi Films.

=== Reviews ===
Azmaish was well received by critics at its various premieres. Commentators were appreciative of Sumar and Koechlin for coming up with "astonishingly powerful results" while addressing the sensitive and controversial subjects of secularism and freedom.
