= Angus Barbieri's fast =

Longest fast on record

Barbieri at 472 lb (214 kg) and just before breaking his year-long fast

Angus Barbieri (1938 or 1939 – 7 September 1990) was a Scottish man who fasted for 382 days, from 14 June 1965 to 30 June 1966. He subsisted on tea, coffee, sparkling water, vitamins and yeast extract while living at home in Tayport, Scotland, frequently visiting Maryfield Hospital for medical evaluation. Barbieri went from almost 33 stone / 456 pounds (207 kg) to 13 stone / 180 pounds (82 kg), losing 20 stone / 276 pounds (125 kg) and setting a record for the length of a fast.

== Early life ==
Agostino "Angus" Barbieri was born in Tayport, Scotland to Italian parents who ran a fish and chip shop. Due to his weight, he often required assistance with ordinary tasks. When Barbieri travelled to the 1960–61 British Home Championship at Wembley Stadium in April 1961, he needed a group of people to push and pull him through the door of the bus. Unable to fit through a turnstile at the stadium, Barbieri was escorted through a gate by a police guard, and many other fans without tickets reportedly hopped the police lines to enter the stadium while the police were occupied.

== Fast ==
In 1965, at the age of 27, Barbieri checked into the Maryfield Hospital in Dundee. Initially only a short fast was planned; doctors believed short fasts were preferable to longer ones. Barbieri insisted on continuing because "he adapted so well and was eager to reach his 'ideal' weight". To avoid temptation, he quit working at his father's fish and chips shop, which closed down during the fast. As the fast progressed, he lost all desire for food. For 382 days, from 14 June 1965 through 30 June 1966, he consumed only vitamins, electrolytes, an unspecified amount of yeast (a source of all essential amino acids) and zero-calorie beverages such as tea, coffee, and sparkling water, although he occasionally added milk and/or sugar to the beverages, especially during the final weeks of the fast.

Barbieri began his treatment in the hospital but for most of the 382 days lived at home, visiting the hospital for outpatient checkups, including blood and urine samples. Stool tests were not taken but he reportedly went up to 48 days between stools. His starting weight was recorded at 33 stone / 456 pounds (207 kg) and the fast officially stopped on 1 July 1966 when Barbieri had reached his goal weight of 13 stone / 180 pounds (82 kg). For the next ten days, the doctors placed him on a diet of salt and then sugar in preparation for solid food. Thus, some sources record the fast as being 392 days instead of 382.

== Breakfast ==
After 1 year and 26 days without food, Angus Barbieri ate his first solid meal at 10 AM on 11 July 1966: a boiled egg and a slice of buttered bread. He said to the gathered newspaper reporters and photographers, "I have forgotten what food tasted like ... It went down OK. I feel a bit full but I thoroughly enjoyed it."

== Record ==
In the 1971 edition of The Guinness Book of Records, Barbieri's 382-day fast was recognized as the longest recorded. As of 2026, Barbieri retains the record for the longest fast without solid food. Guinness does not actively encourage fasting-related records due to safety concerns.

== Follow-up ==
Doctors were amazed by Barbieri's ability to resist the temptation to eat without having to stay in the hospital. He celebrated his achievement by going on a vacation in Spain for three weeks, and a 1973 study found that Barbieri maintained a healthy weight of 14 stone / 196 pounds (89 kg), concluding that "prolonged fasting in this patient had no ill-effects". He moved to Warwick, married, and had two sons. Barbieri died in September 1990 after a short illness at age 51.

== See also ==
- Andreas Mihavecz
- Management of obesity
