= Jazz Juttla =

Scottish footballer

Personal information
- Full name: Jaswinder Juttla
- Date of birth: 2 August 1977 (age 49)
- Place of birth: Glasgow, Scotland
- Height: 5 ft 6 in (1.68 m)
- Position: Right back

Youth career
- 1994–1997: Rangers

Senior career*
Years	Team	Apps	(Gls)
1997–1999	Greenock Morton	18	(0)
- Johnstone Burgh
- Cumbernauld United
- * Club domestic league appearances and goals

Jaswinder "Jazz" Juttla (born 2 August 1977) is a Scottish former footballer who played for Greenock Morton. Although his career at senior level was short, he is notable as being one of very few people of Scottish Asian descent to have been involved in professional football in Scotland.

== Career ==
Born in Glasgow and raised in Bearsden, with grandparents originating from the Punjab, India, Juttla came through the youth system at Rangers, winning the Scottish Youth Cup in 1995 and the Glasgow Cup in 1996 alongside future Scotland captain Barry Ferguson. Several experienced domestic and foreign players were ahead of him in the queue for selection Juttla was released by Rangers without a senior first team appearance (Barry Robson, who later became an international, was another in that Rangers youth squad who left without playing a match).

In 1997, Juttla signed for second-tier Greenock Morton, debuting aged 20. He played in ten league matches in his first season at Cappielow and eight in the second.

In 1999, Juttla left professional football to pursue a career as a police officer. He continued to play in the Junior grade for several years, firstly with Johnstone Burgh then Cumbernauld United before retiring in 2007. He was named by contemporaries in their 'dream teams' as the best player in his position they had encountered at that level. In his career in law enforcement, he became a detective in the Police Scotland force.

== See also ==
- British Asians in association football
