= Nina's Heavenly Delights =

2006 British film by Pratibha Parmar

- Film poster
- Directed by: Pratibha Parmar
- Written by: Andrea Gibb
- Story by: Pratibha Parmar
- Produced by: Pratibha Parmar; Marion Pilowsky; Chris Atkins
- Starring: Shelley Conn; Laura Fraser
- Cinematography: Simon Dennis
- Edited by: Mary Finlay
- Music by: Steve Isles
- Production companies: Kali Films; Priority Pictures
- Distributed by: Regent Releasing
- Release dates: 29 September 2006 (United Kingdom); 21 November 2007 (United States)
- Running time: 94 minutes
- Country: United Kingdom
- Language: English

Nina's Heavenly Delights is a 2006 British drama romance comedy film, directed by Pratibha Parmar. The film was released on 29 September 2006 in the United Kingdom, and on 21 November 2007 in the United States.

The film was the first feature film by Parmar, who was known for her previous documentaries.

== Synopsis ==
When young Glaswegian cook Nina Shah (Shelley Conn) returns home for her father's funeral after three estranged years in London, England, she begins a romantic relationship with Lisa (Laura Fraser), an old childhood friend who now owns half the late father's Indian restaurant, The New Taj. Together they seek to save the restaurant by winning the national "Best in the West Curry Competition" for a third time. Nina's mother Suman (Veena Sood) and brother Kary (Atta Yaqub), however, want to sell the place to fellow restaurateur Raj (Art Malik), whose chef son Sanjay (Raji James) had been left at the altar by Nina. Lending the young women moral support is Nina's flamboyant gay friend Bobbi (Ronny Jhutti), and Nina's younger sister Priya (Zoe Henretty).

== Cast ==
- Shelley Conn as Nina Shah
- Laura Fraser as Lisa
- Art Malik as Raj
- Ronny Jhutti as Bobbi
- Veena Sood as Suman Shah
- Atta Yaqub as Kary Shah
- Zoe Henretty as Priya Shah
- Raji James as Sanjay
- Elaine C. Smith as Auntie Mamie
- Rita Wolf as Auntie Tumi
- Kathleen McDermott as Janice
- Kulvinder Ghir as TV host
- Tariq Mullan as Ravi
- Francisco Bosch as Shriv

== Critical reception ==
The film gained mostly negative reviews, and received 16% on the critics score on Rotten Tomatoes. It was also a commercial flop. The film only made $267 on its opening week in the US and Canada. It grossed $50,171 worldwide.

AfterEllen said "showcasing a positive lesbian relationship while avoiding some of the typical queer film catch traps is where Nina’s Heavenly Delights succeeds....If we’re measuring ingredients by heart, this one is just right."

The New York Times said, "Diluted by menu pornography and cringeworthy dance routines, ... the movie's central romance barely qualifies as such. 'It's all about chemistry,' Nina says. Too bad she and her co-star possess so little."

Producer Chris Atkins said it was "the worst film that I or anyone else has produced". He used the film as an example to criticise the now defunct UK Film Council. He said the film "ticked all the boxes" and, as a result, was granted £250,000 by the Film Council via Scottish Screen. Atkins said it was a "waste of public money". This was somewhat ironic as, in July 2016, Atkins was jailed for five years for defrauding HMRC in a film-finance tax scam.

== Awards ==
Year	Award	Category	Result
2008	GLAAD Media Awards	Outstanding Film - Limited Release	Nominated
2007	Paris Lesbian and Feminist Film Festival	Best Feature Film	Won
2007	Fresno Film Festival	Wolfe Award for Best Feature Film	Won
2007	Tampa LGBT Film Festival	Audience Award for Best International Film	Won

== Soundtrack ==
The film's soundtrack includes the Shelly Poole's song "Lost in You" and "Maybe That's What It Takes" by Alex Parks.

== See also ==
- List of LGBT-related films directed by women
