= Khamosh Pani =

2003 film by Sabiha Sumar

- Khamosh Pani movie poster
- Directed by: Sabiha Sumar
- Written by: Paromita Vohra
- Produced by: Helge Albers; Philippe Avril; Sachithanandam Sathananthan; Claudia Tronnier
- Starring: Kirron Kher; Shilpa Shukla; Aamir Ali Malik; Adnan Shah Tipu; Rehan Sheikh
- Cinematography: Ralph Netzer
- Edited by: Bettina Böhler
- Music by: Madan Gopal Singh; Arshad Mahmood
- Distributed by: Shringar Films (India)
- Release dates: 15 August 2003 (Locarno Film Festival); 8 October 2004 (Pakistan)
- Running time: 105 minutes
- Countries: India; Pakistan
- Language: Punjabi

Khamosh Pani (Punjabi: خاموش پاݨی (Shahmukhi), ਖ਼ਾਮੋਸ਼ ਪਾਣੀ (Gurmukhi); Silent Waters) is a 2003 Indo-Pakistani film about a widowed mother and her young son living in a Punjabi village as it undergoes radical changes during the late 1970s.

Shot in a Pakistani village, the film was also released in India. It won seven awards, including Golden Leopard (Best Film), Best Actress, and Best Direction at the 56th Locarno International Film Festival, Switzerland.

== Plot ==
In 1979 in Charkhi, a village in the Punjab province of Pakistan, Ayesha (a middle-aged widow) lives with her son Saleem, a teenager in love with schoolgirl Zubeida. Ayesha supports herself and Saleem with her late husband's pension and by giving lessons in the Qur'an to village girls. She refuses to go to the village well, and her neighbor's daughters draw water for her. Villagers like Amin, the postman, are troubled by the recent hanging of former prime minister Zulfikar Ali Bhutto by Zia-ul-Haq, the new military dictator who has promised to enforce Islamic law and encourages Islamic missionary and political groups. Two Islamic activists come to the village and, supported by the village choudhury, spread their message of Islamic zealotry and gain recruits to fight the Soviet invasion of Afghanistan. The older men in the village are disdainful of their intolerance and puritanism, cynical about Zia's postponement of elections and angry when the activists accuse them of being traitors. The activists gain a following amongst the village youth, including Saleem. They cajole and intimidate Saleem into attending a political meeting in Rawalpindi, where the speakers exhort the audience to commit themselves to jihad for the creation of an Islamic Pakistani state. Attracted by their zeal and call to serve Islam and Pakistan, Saleem (who wants to be more than a village farmer) breaks up with Zubeida and becomes estranged from his mother. Ayesha unsuccessfully tries to dissuade him from following the Islamists' call for zealotry. Saleem helps build a wall around the girls' school to "protect" them and enforces the closing of village shops during namaaz in line with Zia-ul-Haq's Islamisation, and Ayesha and Zubeida are alarmed by his transformation.

After an agreement between the Indian and Pakistani governments, a group of Sikh pilgrims from India, arrives in Pakistan to visit Sikh shrines. They come to Charkhi, the village they were forced to flee during the bloody partition of India in 1947. A pilgrim wants to look for his sister, who he believes survived the violence. The visitors have a mixed reception: a warm welcome from the village barber and hostility from the growing number of young Muslim zealots. Saleem is embarrassed when he discovers that his mother sent food to the pilgrims and that she teaches the village girls that non-Muslims too can go to heaven. The pilgrim asks some villagers, including Amin, if they knew if a Sikh woman survived the riots. They say they do not know, but Amin later visits the pilgrim's hut and tells him to look for the woman who never goes to the well. Following the girls who bring water to her house, the pilgrim finds Ayesha. When he asks her if she knows a Sikh woman who survived the riots, she anxiously tells him to leave. Saleem sees the pilgrim talking to his mother, and hears him call her "Veero" and tell her that her father wanted to see her before he died. Saleem is shocked to learn that Ayesha was Veero, a Sikh; in a flashback, she is seen among a group of village Sikh women lined up to jump into the village well rather than be raped by a Muslim mob in 1947. The Sikh men (including her father) want her to jump, but Veero runs away and is later caught, raped and imprisoned. Her rapist, remorseful, offers to marry her, and she begins life as a Muslim.

Saleem reports this to his friends, who demand that Ayesha make a public declaration of her Islamic faith; she refuses and is shunned by the villagers, including her best friends. For the first time in over thirty years, she must fetch her own water. Ayesha meets her Sikh brother at the well but refuses to accompany him, condemning her father for encouraging her to commit suicide and asking how he would feel knowing that she was living as a Muslim. Her isolation increases, with only Zubeida keeping in touch with her. Realizing that she cannot escape her past, Ayesha jumps into the well. Saleem buries her, gathers her papers and belongings, and throws them into the river.

In 2002 in Rawalpindi, Zubeida remembers Ayesha. In the street she sees a bearded Saleem, secretary-general of an Islamist organisation, answering questions about the compatibility of Islamic law with democracy.

== Cast ==
- Kirron Kher as Ayesha
- Aamir Ali Malik as Saleem
- Navtej Johar as Jaswant, Veero/Ayesha's brother
- Shilpa Shukla as Zubeida
- Arshad Mehmood as Mehboob
- Salman Shahid as Amin
- Sarfaraz Ansari as Rashid
- Abid Ali as Chaudhary
- Adnan Shah as Mazhar
- Khursheed Shahid as Singer
- Fareeha Jabeen as Shabnam
- Shazim Ashraf as Zubair
- Rehan Sheikh as Afshan
- Barkat Ullah as Mubarak Bhai
- Nisar Qadri as Haji Munnavar
- Saba Malik as Courtesan
- Madan Gopal Singh as Sikh Pilgrim
- Gurjot Singh Mann as Sikh Pilgrim
- Suhair Fariha Khan as Veero (young Ayesha)

== Production ==
The role of Ayesha Khan was earlier offered to veteran Pakistani actress Bushra Ansari who had to reject it to focus on her daughters' studies around the time the movie was being shot.

== Reception ==
Taran Adarsh of IndiaFM wrote that "Very rarely do you come across a film that reflects the moods of the years gone by. KHAMOSH PANI ['Silent Waters'], directed by Sabiha Sumar, is one such film. The thought-provoking film transports you to Pakistan during 1979, with frequent flashes of 1947 injected in the narrative".

== Awards ==
- 2003: Won Top Prize at Locarno International Film Festival
  - Best Actress: Kirron Kher
  - Don Quixote Award - Special Mention: Sabiha Sumar
  - Golden Leopard (Best Film): Sabiha Sumar
  - Prize of the Ecumenical Jury: Sabiha Sumar
  - Youth Jury Award - Special Mention: Sabiha Sumar
- 2003: Nantes Three Continents Festival
  - Audience Award: Sabiha Sumar
  - Silver Montgolfiere: Sabiha Sumar
- 2003: Karachi International Film Festival
  - Special Jurors' Selection Ciepie
  - Best Actress in a Leading Role: Kirron Kher
  - Best Screenplay: Paromita Vohra

== See also ==
- List of Asian historical drama films
