= Jainti Dass Saggar =

Scottish doctor and councillor from India

- Born: 6 September 1898; Deharru, Punjab
- Died: 14 November 1954 (aged 56); Dundee, Scotland
- Monuments: Saggar Street, Dundee (named after him in 1974)
- Education: University of St Andrews
- Occupations: Physician, local authority councillor
- Years active: 1919–1954
- Known for: Served 18 years as Labour councillor. First non-white local authority councillor in Scotland.
- Children: 2
- Medical career
- Sub-specialties: Ophthalmology

Jainti Dass Saggar (6 September 1898 – 14 November 1954) was an Indian-born doctor in Dundee, Scotland, who in 1936 became the first non-white local authority councillor in Scotland. He served 18 years as a Labour Party councillor and was one of Dundee's longest-serving council members.

== Early life and family ==
Jainti Saggar was born on 6 September 1898 in the village of Deharru in Ludhiana district, Punjab, British India. He was the second son and the fourth of six children of Hindu parents, Ram Saran Dass Saggar (1870–1943), a merchant, and his wife, Sardhi Devi Uppal. Saggar studied at Ram Parshad Sood and Lahore Medical College.

In 1931, Saggar married Jean (also referred to as Jane) Quinn, the daughter of a bailie and town councillor of Dundee. They had daughters Sheila and Kamala.

== Medicine ==
In 1919, Saggar moved to the United Kingdom to study medicine at University College, Dundee (which at the time was part of the University of St Andrews), where he also played hockey. He graduated MB ChB 1923 and completed postgraduate diplomas in ophthalmology, public health, and surgery.

Saggar was the only Indian doctor in Dundee in the 1920s. He was active in campaigning for improved public health and played a key role in modernising Maryfield Hospital with new equipment. He was on the Eastern Regional Hospital Board and the board of Dundee general hospitals.

Saggar sought to improve health and welfare more broadly by campaigning for provision of school meals, cheap bus fares for the elderly, opening a psychiatric clinic, and arguing for the provision of communal canteens to support poor members of the community.

Saggar served as chairman of the public libraries committee and was a member of the committee of the local branch of the Nursery Schools Association of Great Britain.

== Politics ==
In 1936, Saggar was elected as a Labour Party councillor in Dundee, making him the first non-white local authority councillor in Scotland.

Saggar was a founder member of the local Friends of India branch and a supporter of Indian Independence, who spoke of Gandhi's work to his local Dundee community.

In 1939, he was instrumental in the selection of Krishna Menon as parliamentary candidate for Dundee.

In the late 1930s, Saggar became involved in the debate about imports of cheap jute products from India that were undercutting the profits of manufacturers in Glasgow and the wages of local workers. He was part of a joint delegation of manufacturers and trade unionists that travelled to London to call for the British government to protect the British jute industry, claiming before he went that "as long as cheap labour in India, working under both British and Indian capital, went on increasing, the over production of cheap commodities would have a detrimental effect on Dundee." The matter was part of a wider debate in the 1930s in which British manufacturers and labour felt that their profits and wages might be being sacrificed for the sake of keeping the colonies happy. Saggar called for higher wages for Indian workers which would have had the effect of making their output more expensive and less of a competitive threat in Glasgow.

Saggar was one of the longest-serving members of Dundee Town Council. He defended his position in a November 1945 election (postponed from 1939 due to World War II), then again in May 1949 and in 1952. In 1954, Saggar was re-elected for the final time. Jean Saggar was also elected as Labour candidate in the Riverside Ward of the same election.

== Death and legacy ==
After a morning of seeing patients, Saggar collapsed and died of an intracerebral haemorrhage on 14 November 1954 at Dundee Royal Infirmary. His ashes were later interred with his wife at Balgay Cemetery.

The Lord Provost of Dundee, William Hughes, paid tribute to him after his death, saying: "He was a man of compassion for everyone in need ... he came to Dundee from halfway across the world but no son of Dundee had greater love for its people or worked harder in their interest. Dundee is much poorer by his passing."

In 1960, the Dundee Corporation named Saggar Street after him (formerly this has been Greenbank Rise). He had at one time supported the building of houses on this same site. In 1974, a public library was opened in memory of him and his brother.

In 2015, his daughter Kamala Stewart and her husband, John Stewart, published his biography, Dr Jainti Dass Saggar – from Deharru to Dundee, with the help of their daughter, Rosemary McKnight.

In 2020, the University of Dundee celebrated the creation of a Saggar Scholarship in his honour.
