= New Scot =

Immigrants to Scotland of any nationality

New Scots is a term sometimes used to describe people of any nationality who have immigrated or moved to Scotland. The term has a basis in Scottish Government policy geared towards welcoming refugees and economic migrants and is widely used in modern Scottish media and culture. Anyone of any incomer nationality can describe themselves as a 'New Scot' from the first day they arrive without affecting their existing nationality.

== Terminology ==
The history of Scottish peoples includes a mixture of immigrants from outside of Scotland. However, the term New Scots has been used to describe new immigrants since the twentieth century after the Second World War, with the increase of settled immigrants from other parts of the world and especially after the decolonisation period of the mid 20th century, as well as more modern refugee 'crises' of the 21st century.

In the 2000s, the Scottish government has also employed the term in official documents, speaking both in terms of the new talent immigrants bring to Scotland and those who come as refugees and asylum seekers.

'New Scot' has occasionally been used in a racist or disparaging context to suggest that ethnic minorities are 'less Scottish': in 2024, Aberdeen Scottish National Party councillor Kairin van Sweeden was found to have breached the code of conduct by the Ethical Standards Commissioner for referring to Scottish Labour councillor Deena Tissera as a 'New Scot' during a council meeting. Van Sweeden's comment was found to be "derogatory or disparaging" by suggesting "that [Tissera] was likely to be ignorant by virtue of the fact that she had not lived in Scotland for her whole life."

== See also ==
- Demographics of Scotland
- Scottish Asian
- Black Scottish people
