= Shandana Minhas =

Pakistani writer (born 1975)

- Born: October 26, 1975 (age 50); Karachi, Pakistan
- Occupation: Writer
- Writing career
- Notable works: Tunnel Vision, Survival Tips for Lunatics, Daddy’s Boy, Ferdowsnama
- Notable awards: Karachi Literature Festival Fiction Prize (2015); Karachi Literature Festival English Fiction Prize (2026)
- Website: www.shandanaminhas.com

Shandana Minhas (born 26 October 1975, in Karachi, Pakistan) is a Pakistani writer.

== Personal life ==
Shandana Minhas is a Pakistani writer from Karachi who now lives in London.

== Writing ==
Minhas is an Honorary Fellow in Writing of the International Writing Program at the University of Iowa. Minhas has an MA in prose fiction from the University of East Anglia, and was the recipient of the Malcolm Bradbury Memorial Scholarship.

=== Books ===
Minhas's first novel,Tunnel Vision (2007), is a first-person meditation on life as a woman in a man's world. It was shortlisted for the Commonwealth Writers’ Prize, adapted for the stage by The Madras Players in 2009, and published in Italian as Pakistan Graffiti in 2012. It has been described as “piercingly witty and acutely perceptive” and a “silent bestseller”.

Her second novel, Survival Tips for Lunatics (2014), is a “bitingly funny” adventure in which a bickering couple accidentally leaves their two sons behind on a camping trip in Pakistan's turbulent Balochistan province. Alongside critical acclaim, it became the first children's book to win a general fiction prize in the region, taking the French Embassy's Karachi Literature Festival fiction prize (honouring the best writing by a Pakistani or a writer of Pakistani origin worldwide) in 2015.

Minhas's third novel, Daddy’s Boy (2016), tells the story of Asfandyar Ikram, who has no idea that his father is alive - until the day he learns of his death. The book was well-reviewed by The Hindustan Times (“…as hilarious as it is touching; one that’s totally bizarre while also being relatable”),Open Magazine (“The tension builds, tightening like a stretched elastic band, until the shocking denouement, which casts ambiguity on the very title of the book. Starting on a note of laughter, the ending of this gripping novel elicits a gasp of horror”), and multiple other publications. On the cover blurb, Pakistani author Mohammed Hanif called Daddy's Boy “heartbreaking and hilarious”.

Her fourth book, the novella Rafina (2018), was described in Dawn as “a stark portrayal of the lengths a young, ambitious and somewhat desperate young woman has to go to in order to fulfil her dreams and get financial security.” Minhas originally wrote the book in 2004.

Her fifth book, Ferdowsnama, was published by Vintage, Penguin India in February 2025. The book follows a Mughal hunting party as they track down wild threats in service of the Emperor. In advance praise, India historian and author Rana Safvi said “By turns humorous, moving and poignant, this beautifully crafted, if at times startling, novel not only captures the era but also highlights Ferdows's extraordinary resilence", and Pakistani writer Musharraf Ali Farooqi called it “riveting and magnificent.” A Dawn review said that "...with Ferdowsnama, Shandana Minhas has given us a brilliant novel that is alternately chilling and grim, yet darkly humorous and engrossing." An interview in The News described her body of work as "an oeuvre without boundaries" and said she "does not lend herself to straightforward categorisation". Ferdowsnama won the KLF English Fiction prize (honouring the best English writing by a Pakistani or a writer of Pakistani origin worldwide) in 2026.

=== Other works ===
Minhas's short story,The New Woman in the Old Flat, was published in the Griffith Review’s ‘New Asia Now’ issue showcasing “outstanding young writers from the countries at the centre of Asia’s ongoing transformation”, in 2015. Other stories have appeared in literary magazines such as The Indian Quarterly, and A Pakistani Homecoming was published in Dawn, the country's most widely read newspaper, to mark the 70th anniversary of Independence.

Since 1997, Minhas has been a regular contributor to Pakistani and international publications. Her columns and essays have been featured in the Herald, The Express Tribune, EPW and DNA India. She has scripted several documentary films, with subjects covering human rights, environmental and development issues in Karachi, and Balochistan. She wrote and co-directed with Maheen Zia, in 2003, a short film about the murders of Shia doctors in Pakistan.

She was expert faculty for the 2020 and 2021 International Writing Program’s workshop for young writers, Between the Lines: Peace and the Writing Experience.

Her work has been anthologised in Oxford University Press’s In the New Century, An Anthology of Pakistani Literature in English and The Young Earth Lover’s Book of Nature, edited by Deepa Agarwal
