= Black Scottish people =

Racial or ethnic group in Scotland with African ancestry

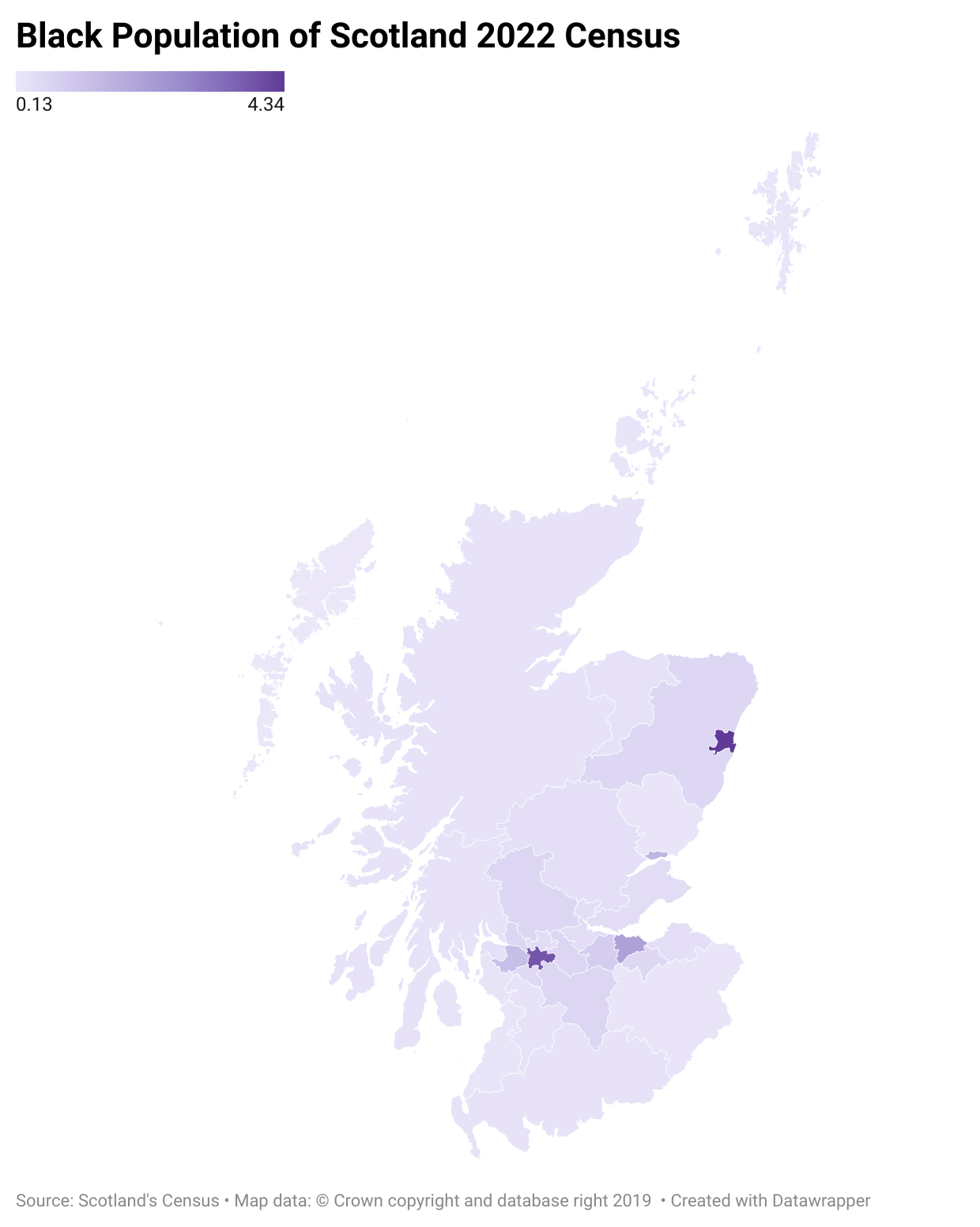
- Proportion of Black, African, and Caribbean population by Council Area in Scotland, aggregated 2022 Census data.

Total population
- 65,414 – 1.2% (2022 Census); African: 58,636; Caribbean: 2,214; Black and Other Black: 4,564

Regions with significant populations
- Glasgow City: 23,743 – 3.8%
- City of Edinburgh: 10,881 – 2.1%
- Aberdeen City: 9,419 – 4.2%

Languages
- British English; African English; Caribbean English; Scottish English; Creole languages; African languages

Religion
- Predominantly Christianity; minorities follow Islam, Irreligion, Atheism, Baháʼí Faith, Rastafari, Traditional African religions, other religions

Black Scottish people (also referred to as African-Scottish, Afro-Scottish, or Black Scottish) are a racial or ethnic group of Scottish who are ethnically African or Black. Used in association with black Scottish identity, the term commonly refers to Scottish of Black African and African-Caribbean descent. The group represents approximately 1.2 percent of the total population of Scotland.

== Background ==
=== Identity ===
The identity of Black Scottish people has evolved since the arrival of Black people in Scotland as early as the fifteenth century, with significant numbers arriving in the twentieth century after World War II. The development of a cohesive Black Scottish identity has progressed, with Black African and Afro-Caribbean descent the most commonly claimed ancestry involved in the sense of identity. Among other factors, studies into the experiences of Scottish Somalis, who tend to be historically newer immigrant groups to the nation, have shown that ethnoreligious factors can complicate the expression of any monocultural or racial identity of Black Scottish.

The distribution of this identity remains highly urbanised, with the most recent census data showing the majority of the population concentrated in the three largest cities: Glasgow, Edinburgh, and notably, Aberdeen City, which holds the highest proportional concentration of Black, African, and Caribbean residents in Scotland.

=== Census ===
Historical Population
Year	Pop.	±%
1991	6,353	—
2001	8,025	+26.3%
2011	36,178	+350.8%
2022	65,414	+80.8%
Source: National Records of Scotland

Black Scottish people by census data
Ethnic group	2022		2011		2001		1991	
Ethnic group	Number	%	Number	%	Number	%	Number	%
Black Scottish people	65,414	1.20%	36,178	0.72%	8,025	0.16%	6,353	0.13%
—African	58,636		29,638		5,118		2,773	
—Black Caribbean	2,214		3,430		1,778		934	
—Other Black	4,018		3,110		1,129		2,646	
Scotland	5,439,842	100%	5,295,403	100%	5,062,011	100%	4,998,567	100%

At the 2022 census, 2,214 identified as 'Caribbean, Caribbean Scottish or Caribbean British', 58,636 identified as falling under the broad 'African' category and 4,018 identified as falling under the 'Other Caribbean or Black' category, for a total of 65,414 making up 1.20% of the Scottish population. Migration from Africa is largely responsible for the growth in the black population in Scotland, with the African population increasing by more than 21-fold since 1991 when ethnic data was first recorded.

According to the 2011 UK Census, Black Scottish people (self-described as African, Caribbean, Black or any other Black background) were numbered at about 36,000. This figure indicates an increase in population of 28,000 Black Scottish since the previous UK census in 2001. The group represented around 0.7% of Scotland's population, compared to 3.0% of the overall UK population.

The 2001 census recorded 1,778 Black Caribbean people, 5,118 Black African people and 1,129 people in the Black Scottish or Other Black category, for a total of 8,025 Black people in Scotland.

The 1991 census recorded 934 Black Caribbean people, 2,773 Black African people and 2,646 people in the Black other category, for a total of 6,353 Black people in Scotland. This represented 0.13% of the total population of Scotland.

== Notable Black Scottish people ==
=== Arts and entertainment ===
- Aminatta Forna (writer)
- Kayus Bankole (member of Mercury Prize winners Young Fathers)
- Shereen Cutkelvin (singer, presenter and actress)
- Izuka Hoyle (actress)
- Nicolette (musician)
- Tony Osoba (actor)
- Ncuti Gatwa (actor)
- Moyo Akandé (actress)
- Layla-Roxanne Hill (writer and activist)
- Finley Quaye (musician)
- Emeli Sandé (musician)
- Jackie Kay (writer)
- Dr. Eunice Olumide MBE (model, author, film director, art curator, actress, musician, broadcaster)
- Luke Sutherland (novelist and musician)

=== Military ===
The diary of World War I veteran Arthur Roberts has been noted as an important historical document, for its preservation of the historical record of one of the earliest known Black Scottish soldiers.

=== Sport ===
==== Association football ====
The British Guiana-born Andrew Watson is widely considered to be the world's first association footballer of Black heritage (his father was White and mother Black) to play at international level. He was capped three times for Scotland between 1881 and 1882. Watson also played for Queen's Park, the leading Scottish club at the time, and later became their secretary. He led the team to several Scottish Cup wins, thus becoming the first player of Black heritage to win a major competition.

With some brief exceptions, such as Jamaican born Gil Heron at Celtic, Walter Tull signing for Rangers, and John Walker at Hearts, Black players largely disappeared from Scottish football for the next 100 years until the arrival of Mark Walters at Rangers in 1988. Walters arrival at the club resulted in incidents of racial abuse.

The Scotland national team did not call up a second player of Black heritage until Nigel Quashie (Black Ghanaian father and White English mother), made his debut against Estonia in May 2004. He qualified to play for Scotland, due to having a grandfather from Scotland. Subsequently Coatbridge-born Chris Iwelumo (Black father from Nigeria), has also played for Scotland. Other notable players with black heritage who were born in Scotland, or have represented Scotland, include:

- Azeem Abdulai
- Che Adams
- Ikechi Anya
- Charles Boli
- Jacob Brown
- Karamoko Dembele
- Ethan Erhahon
- Islam Feruz
- Kevin Harper
- Chris Iwelumo
- Vic Kasule
- Tsoanelo Letsosa
- Leeroy Makovora
- Leighton McIntosh
- Brian McPhee
- Dapo Mebude
- Dire Mebude
- Kieran Ngwenya
- Ryan Oné
- Iffy Onuora
- Ewan Otoo
- Emmanuel Panther
- Matt Phillips
- Jai Quitongo
- Eseosa Sule
- Callum Tapping
- Ifeoma Dieke

==== Other sports ====
- Joe Ansbro, Rugby
- Sean Crombie, Rugby
- Kieron Achara, Basketball
- Kwame Nkrumah-Acheampong, Winter Olympic Skier

=== Miscellaneous ===
- Ellen More, servant to Margaret Tudor
- Lesley Lokko (architect, academic, and novelist)
- Jessie M Soga (suffragist and singer)

== Social and political issues ==
=== Discrimination ===
The group has faced prejudice and racism in Scottish society. In a Strathclyde University survey, almost 45 percent of black Scottish reported experiencing discrimination between 2010 and 2015.

== In fiction ==
- "Of Ane Blak-Moir", a poem describing an African woman at the court of James IV of Scotland.
- Tavish Finnegan DeGroot, more well known as the Demoman from Team Fortress 2, is a self-described "black Scottish cyclops", having lost an eye.
- Jerome "Chef" McElroy, a character from South Park, hails from Scotland.
- Jim "Jock" McClaren, a character in Porridge.
- Elmo McElroy in The 51st State is a descendant of a relationship between a slave and their owner who is of the McElroy clan; thereby making him the heir to the ancestral estate.
- In 2019, multiple media sources reported that African-American actor Denzel Washington would play the Scottish title character in Joel Coen's movie adaptation of William Shakespeare's play Macbeth. The film was eventually released in 2021 as The Tragedy of Macbeth.

== See also ==
- Demographics of Scotland
- Black British people
- Black Welsh people
- Black African
- African diaspora
- Spain (surname)
- New Scot
