= Sabiha Sumar =

Pakistani filmmaker

- Born: 29 August 1961 (age 65); Karachi, Pakistan
- Education: Karachi Grammar School
- Alma mater: Sarah Lawrence College; Cambridge University
- Occupation: Filmmaker
- Years active: 1994-present
- Known for: Khamosh Pani; For a Place Under the Heavens
- Spouse: Dr. S Sathananthan
- Children: 2
- Website: www.vidhifilms.com

Sabiha Sumar (born 29 September 1961) is a Pakistani filmmaker and producer. She is best known for her independent documentary films. Her first feature-length film was Khamosh Pani (Silent Waters), released in 2003. She is known for exploring themes of gender, religion, patriarchy and fundamentalism in Pakistan.

Along with Sharmeen Obaid-Chinoy and Samar Minallah, she is among the few Pakistani women independent documentary filmmakers who have screened their work outside Pakistan.

== Early life ==
Sumar was born in Karachi in 1961. Her parents were originally from Bombay (now Mumbai) and moved to Karachi during partition. When Sumar was growing up, her parents hosted many social gatherings that included Sufi poetry, music and liquor. She attended Karachi Grammar School.

Sumar studied Persian Literature at the University of Karachi, followed by Filmmaking and Political Science at Sarah Lawrence College in New York from 1980–83. She completed her post-graduate degree from Cambridge University, England in International Relations.

== Career ==
Sabiha Sumar has earned acclaim for her independent films, which deal with political and social issues such as the effects of religious fundamentalism on society, and especially on women. Sumar's main interest has been on addressing primarily Pakistani women's place in the world and how different aspects of society have affected them over the past several decades. Sumar's first documentary, Who Will Cast the First Stone, deals with the state of three women in prison in Pakistan under the Hudood Ordinances. It won the Golden Gate Award at the San Francisco Film Festival in 1998. The film led to the quashing of death-by-stoning sentence for Shahida Parveen, who was accused of adultery. In 1992 Sumar founded Vidhi Films. Her documentary films include Don't Ask Why (1999), For a Place Under the Heavens (2003), On the roofs of Delhi (2007), and Dinner with the President: A Nation's Journey (2007). Her film, Suicide Warriors, is about women in the Tamil Liberation Army. For a Place Under the Heavens addressed issues of religion, history and phallocentrism and gender. For a Place Under the Heavens kicked off a critical debate on women wearing the hijab in the Muslim World. In 2013, her latest feature film Good Morning Karachi was released. Her films have circulated internationally through film festivals, American universities, women’s organizations and human rights organizations. Sumar’s films have not been widely screened in Pakistan due to its content. Don’t Ask Why aired on a German-French channel. Sumar produced Oscar-winning documentary film Saving Face.

Her first feature film is Khamosh Pani (Silent Waters). It first aired in 2003. Khamosh Pani is a fictional film that looks at religion, gender, honour killings, assault, trauma and colonialism in the wake of partition. It depicts the trauma of partition through a woman’s point of view. Sumar links the violent aftermath of partition to the violence of Zia-ul-Haq’s Islamization in 1979. The latter is a theme she explores in her other work as well, namely For a Place Under the Heavens. Sumar continues in the tradition of Partition cinema, among the likes of Deepa Mehta, Kamal Hasan, and Chadraprakash Dwivdei. Khamosh Pani is one of the first films to offer a perspective on partition cinema from a Muslim lens. Khamosh Pani was initially supposed to be a documentary film. When Sumar was researching for the film, she did not want to make her subjects relive trauma. The film is a fictional narrative that looks at the necessity of silence in face of healing from trauma. Sumar received funding for Khamosh Pani from a number of international sources, including France, Switzerland, Germany, and Sweden. Most of the film was shot in Pakistan. Khamosh Pani won fourteen international awards. It won Best Screenplay at the third KaraFilm Festival in 2003. Sumar won the Golden Leopard for Best Film at the Locarno International Film Festival. She also won the Audience Award and Silver Montgolfiere at the Nantes Three Continents Festival. Khamosh Pani is a First Run title endorsed by the Human Rights Watch. Sumar faced difficulty finding places to screen the film in Pakistan due to its controversial themes. Sumar organised forty-one free screenings of the film across Pakistan. The film sparked a controversy regarding the main character’s suicide after its screening at the Indian Film Festival of Los Angeles.

== Personal life ==
She has two daughters, Dhiya, and Mizsha who accompanied Sumar in For a Place Under the Heavens and "Women's Worlds" Film Festival. Sumar established the Centre for Social Science Research in Karachi.

== Filmography ==
| Year | Title | Notes |
|---|---|---|
| 1988 | Who Will Cast the First Stone? | |
| 1989 | Custodians of the Coast | |
| 1994 | Of Mothers, Mice and Saints | |
| 1996 | Suicide Warriors | |
| 1999 | Don't Ask Why | |
| 2003 | For a Place Under the Heavens | |
| 2003 | Khamosh Pani | |
| 2007 | On the Roofs of Delhi | |
| 2007 | Dinner with the President: A Nation's Journey | |
| 2013 | Good Morning Karachi | |
| 2014 | Lifelines: The Last Drop | |
| 2015 | Khuda Dekh Raha Hai | TV series |
| 2017 | Azmaish: A Journey Through the Subcontinent | |

== Awards and nominations ==
| Year | Festival/Ceremony | Award | Work | Result |
|---|---|---|---|---|
| 1988 | San Francisco Film Festival | Golden Gate Award | Who Will Cast the First Stone | Won |
| 2003 | Locarno International Film Festival | Golden Leopard for Best Film | Khamosh Pani | Won |
| 2003 | Locarno International Film Festival | Prize of the Ecumenical Jury | Khamosh Pani | Won |
| 2003 | Locarno International Film Festival | Don Quixote Award | Khamosh Pani | Special mention |
| 2003 | Locarno International Film Festival | Youth Jury Award | Khamosh Pani | Special mention |
| 2003 | Nantes Three Continents Festival | Silver Montgolfiere | Khamosh Pani | Won |
| 2003 | Nantes Three Continents Festival | Audience Award | Khamosh Pani | Won |
| 2003 | Nantes Three Continents Festival | Golden Montgolfiere | Khamosh Pani | Nominated |
| | Kerala International Film Festival | Golden Crow Pheasant | Khamosh Pani | Nominated |
| 2008 | Sundance Film Festival | Grand Prize Jury | Dinner With the President: A Nation's Journey | Nominated |
| 2016 | 15th Lux Style Awards | Best TV Director | Khuda Dekh Raha Hai | Nominated |
