= Outline of Scotland =

Overview of and topical guide to Scotland

Flag of Scotland

Royal Standard of Scotland

Scottish version of the Coat of Arms

Location of Scotland (dark green) – in Europe (light green & dark grey) – in the United Kingdom (light green)

Scotland is a country which is part of the United Kingdom, having previously been an independent, sovereign country prior to the 1707 union with England. Established in 843, this would make Scotland the second oldest country in Europe and the fifth oldest country in the world. Its monarchy is amongst the oldest in the world, and is the oldest recorded monarchy in Europe.

Occupying the northern third of the largest island, it shares a border with England to the south and is bounded by the North Sea to the east, the Atlantic Ocean to the north and west, and the North Channel and Irish Sea to the southwest. In addition to the mainland, Scotland consists of over 790 islands including the Northern Isles and the Hebrides.

The countries head of government is the First Minister who is the head of the Scottish Government and Keeper of the Great Seal of Scotland. The First Minister chairs the Scottish cabinet and is accountable to the Scottish Parliament which is situated in the countries capital city, Edinburgh.

== General reference ==
- Pronunciation: /ˈskɒtlənd/
- Etymology of "Scotland"
- Common English country name(s): Scotland
- Official English country name(s): Scotland
- Common endonym(s): Alba
- Official endonym(s):
- Adjectival(s): Scottish, Scots, Scotch
- Demonym(s): Scottish, Scots

== Geography of Scotland ==
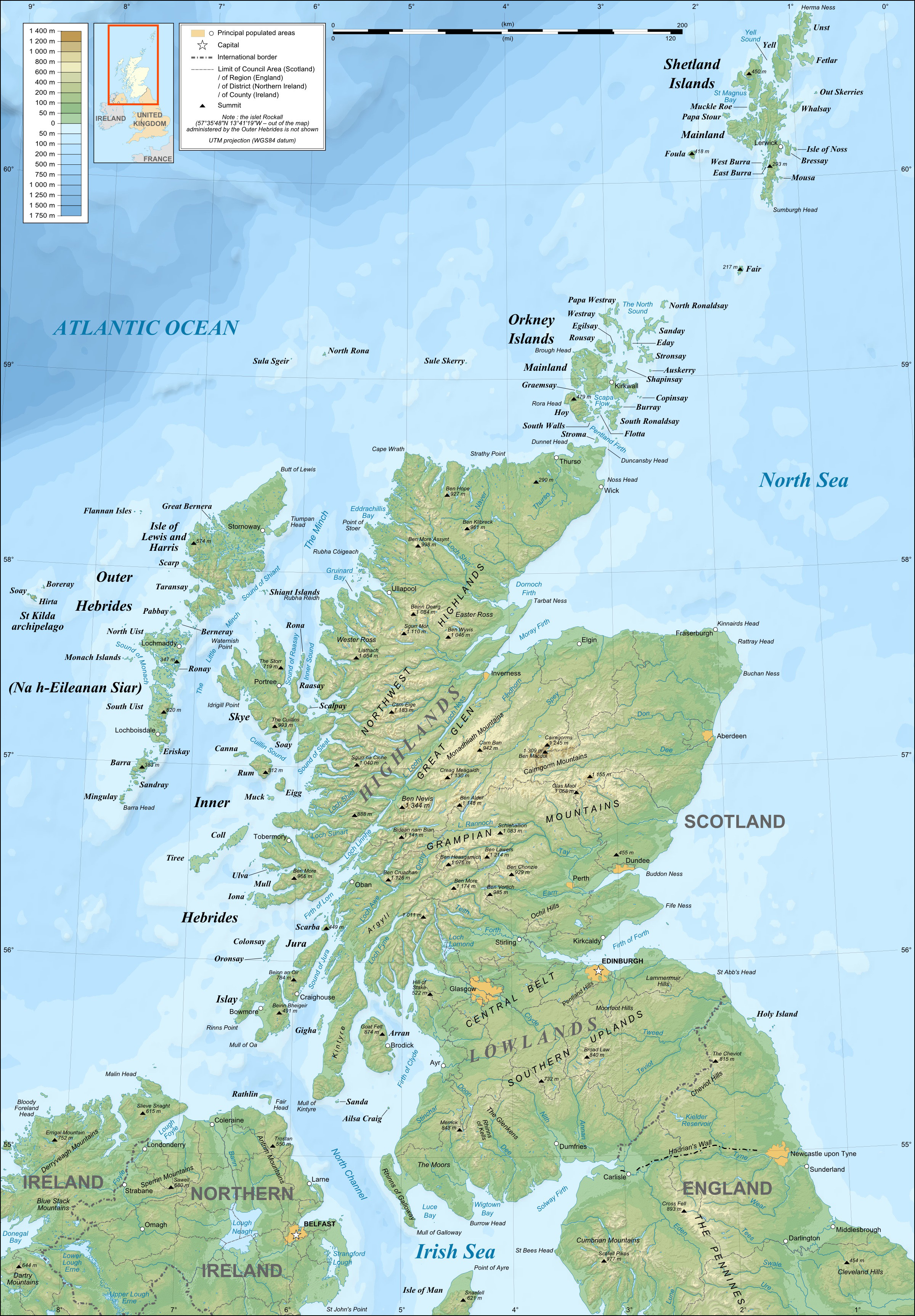
Enlargeable relief map of Scotland

Geography of Scotland

- Scotland is: a country of the United Kingdom.
- Scotland was: an independent, sovereign country until 1707 when it formed a union with England
- Population of Scotland: 5,436,600 (2022 census)
- Area of Scotland: 78 772 km^{2} (30,414 square miles), approximately 32% of the area of the United Kingdom (UK)
- Places in Scotland
- Atlas of Scotland

=== Location ===
- Scotland is situated within the following regions
  - Atlantic Ocean
  - Northern Hemisphere, on the Prime Meridian
  - Eurasia (but not on the mainland)
    - Europe (outline)
      - Northern Europe
        - British Isles
          - Great Britain (the northern third of the island)
          - Several hundred other Islands of Scotland
- Extreme points of Scotland
  - Northerly point: Out Stack, Shetland Islands 60°51′N 0°52′W
  - Highest peak: Ben Nevis, Lochaber at 1,343 m (4,406 ft) 56°47′49.150″N 5°0′17.22″W
- Land boundaries: England 154 km

=== Environment of Scotland ===
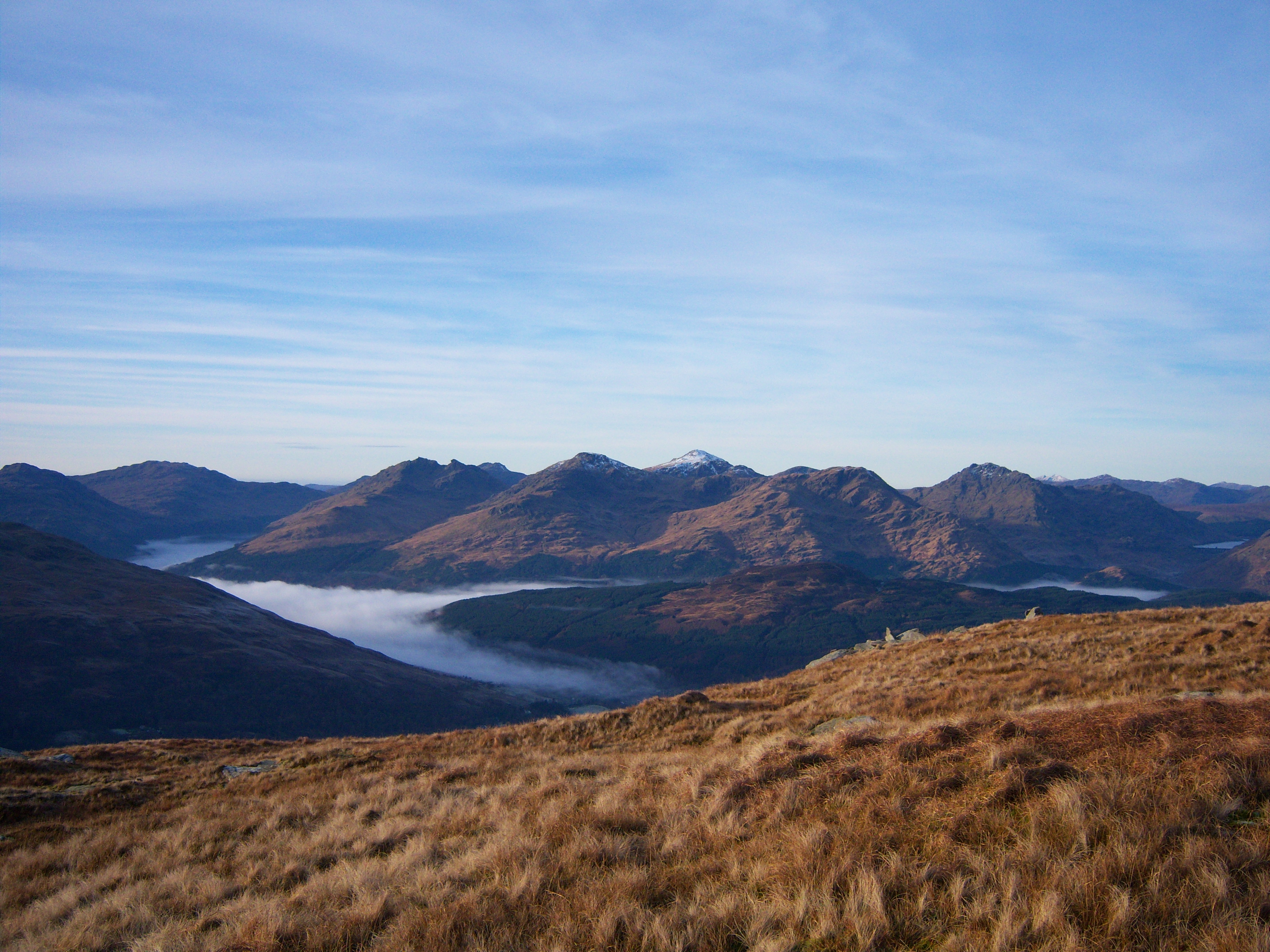
Arrochar Alps

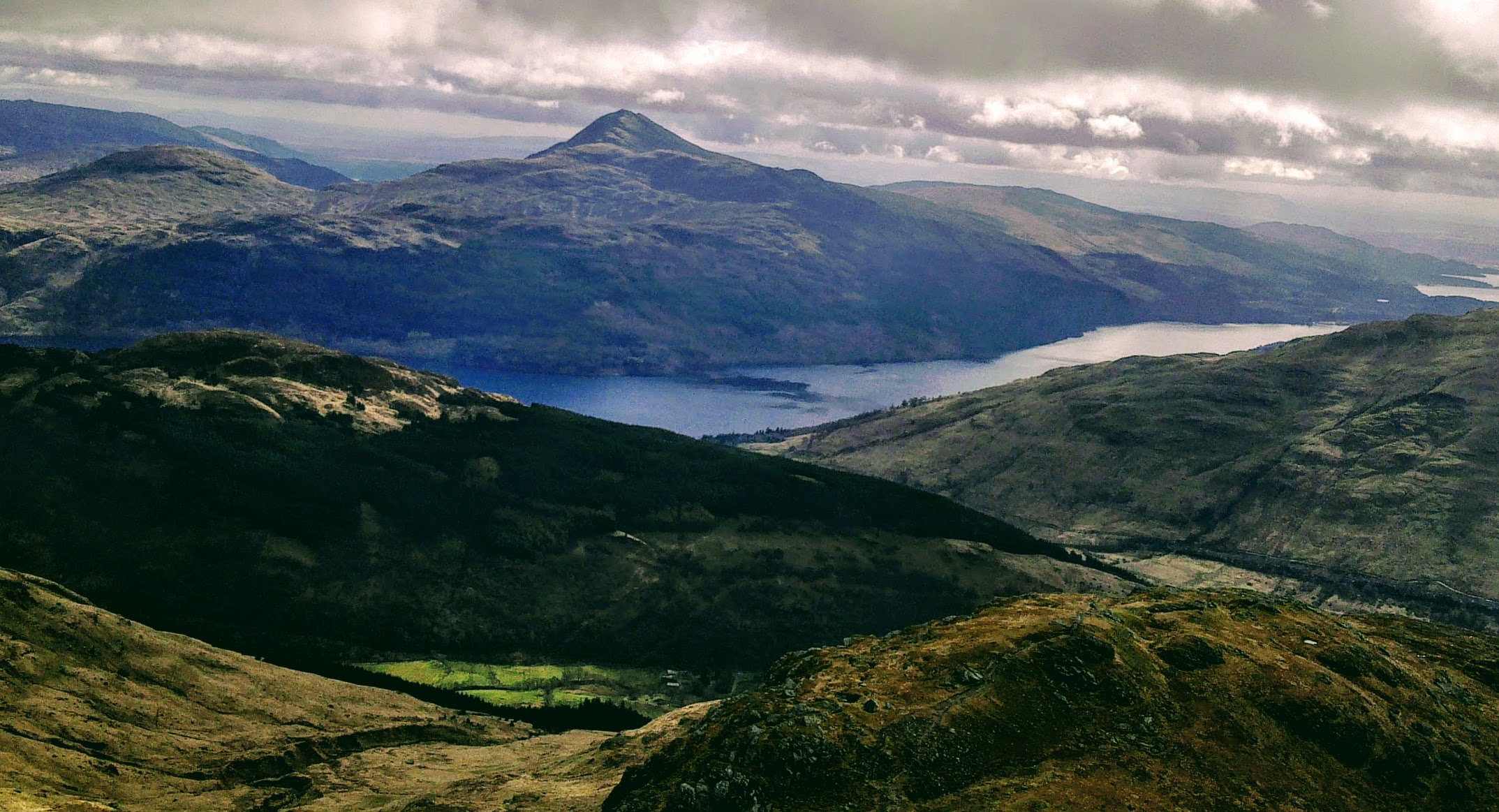
Ben Lomond

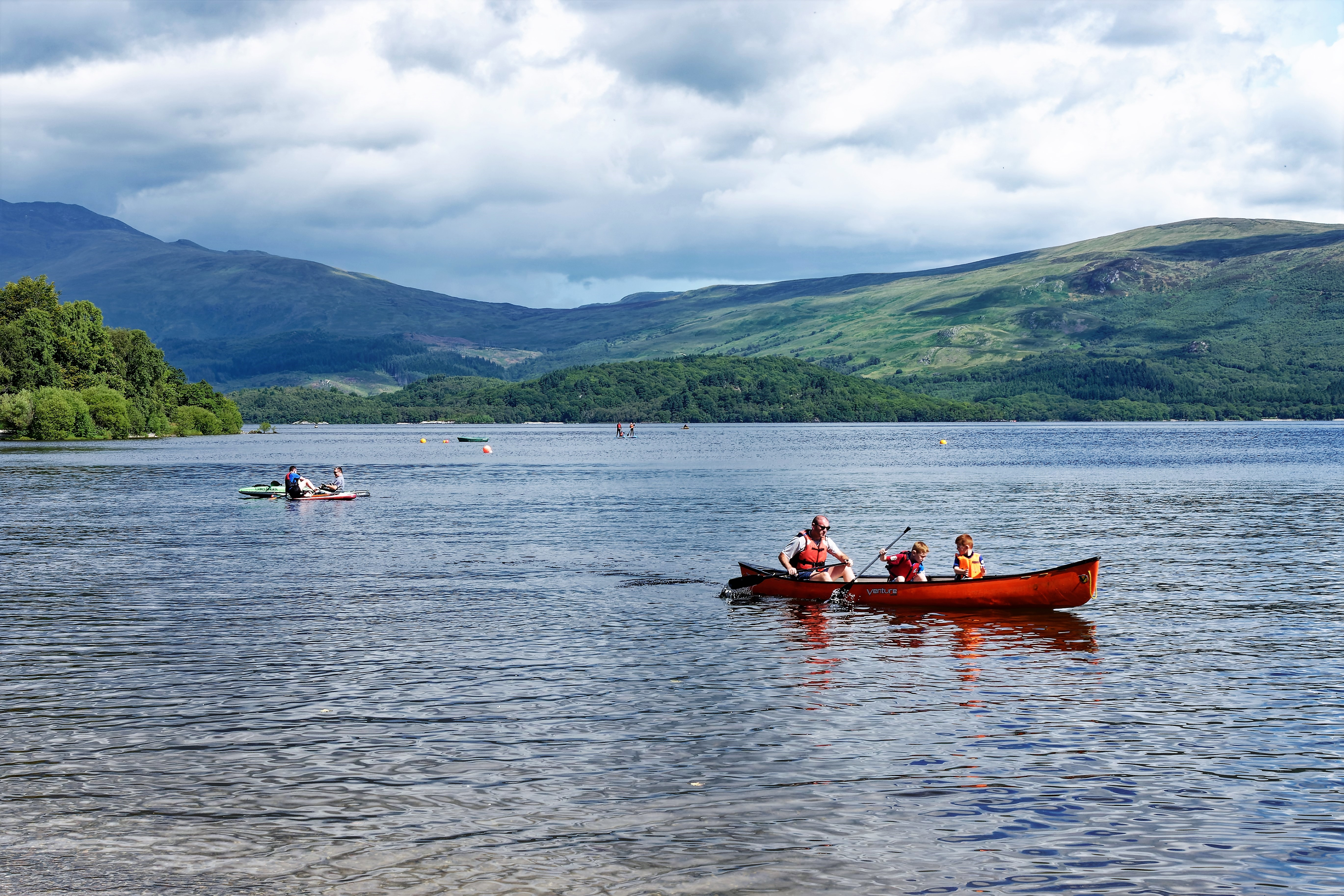
Loch Lomond

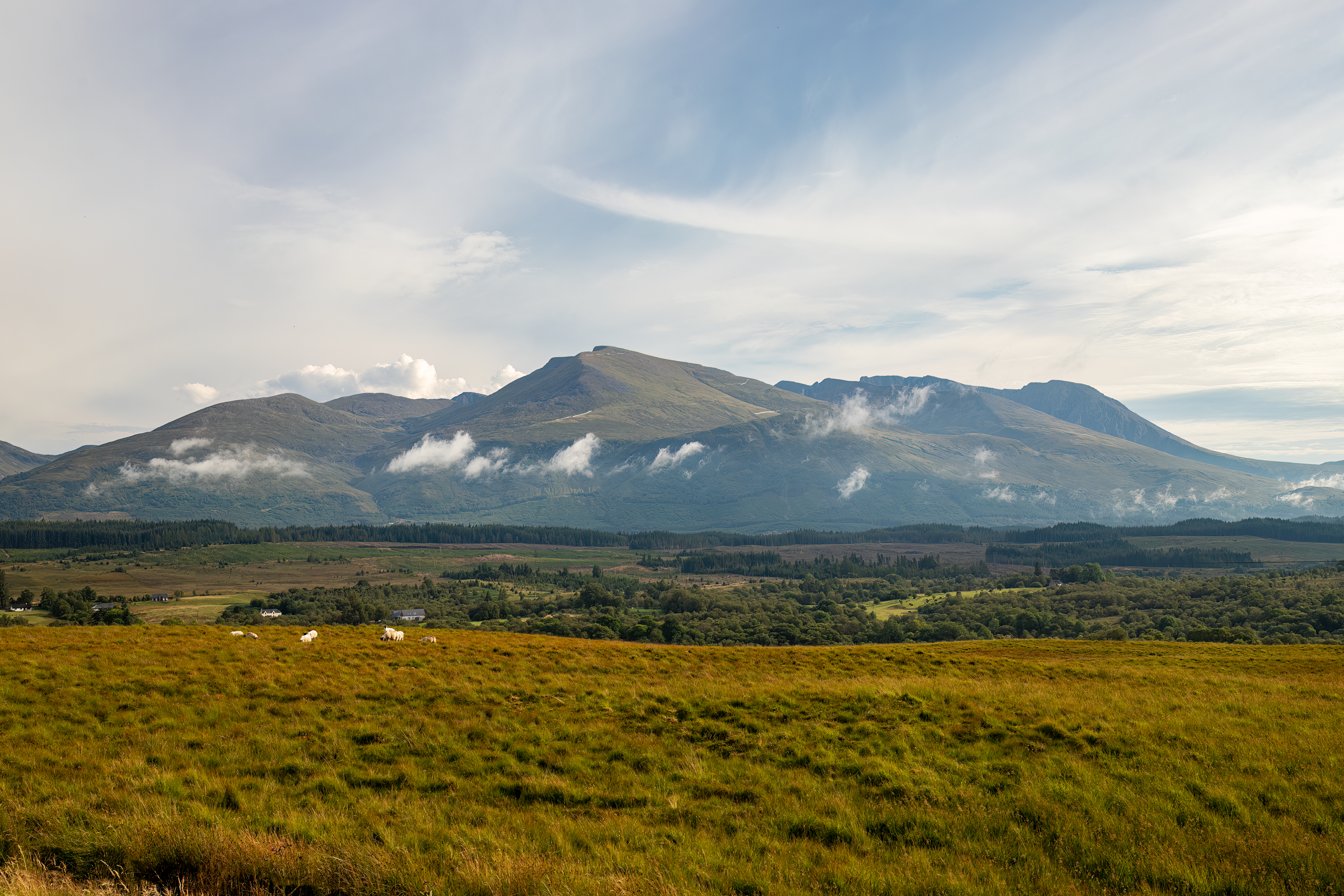
Ben Nevis, the highest peak in the British Isles

Environment of Scotland

- Climate of Scotland
  - Climate change in Scotland
- Ecology of Scotland
  - Renewable energy in Scotland
- Geology of Scotland
- Protected areas of Scotland
  - Biosphere reserves in Scotland
  - National parks of Scotland
- Wildlife of Scotland
  - Flora of Scotland
  - Fauna of Scotland
    - Birds of Scotland
    - Mammals of Scotland
- Domesticated breeds

==== Natural geographic features of Scotland ====
- Firths
- Demographic history of Scotland
- Islands of Scotland
  - Hebrides
    - Inner Hebrides
    - Outer Hebrides
  - Orkney Islands
  - Shetland Islands
  - Islands of the Clyde
  - Islands of the Forth
  - List of freshwater islands in Scotland
- Lochs
  - Lochs in Scotland
- Mountains and hills of Scotland
  - List of Munros
  - Volcanoes in Scotland
- Rivers of Scotland
  - Waterfalls of Scotland
- Valleys of Scotland
- World Heritage Sites in Scotland

=== Regions of Scotland ===
- Central Belt
- Scottish Midlands
- Scottish Highlands
- Scottish Lowlands
- Scottish Borders
- Galloway
- Northern Isles

==== Ecoregions of Scotland ====
List of ecoregions in Scotland

==== Administrative divisions of Scotland ====
Administrative divisions of Scotland

- Council areas of Scotland
  - Civil parishes in Scotland
  - List of burghs in Scotland
  - Municipalities of Scotland
- Unitary authorities of Scotland

===== Municipalities of Scotland =====
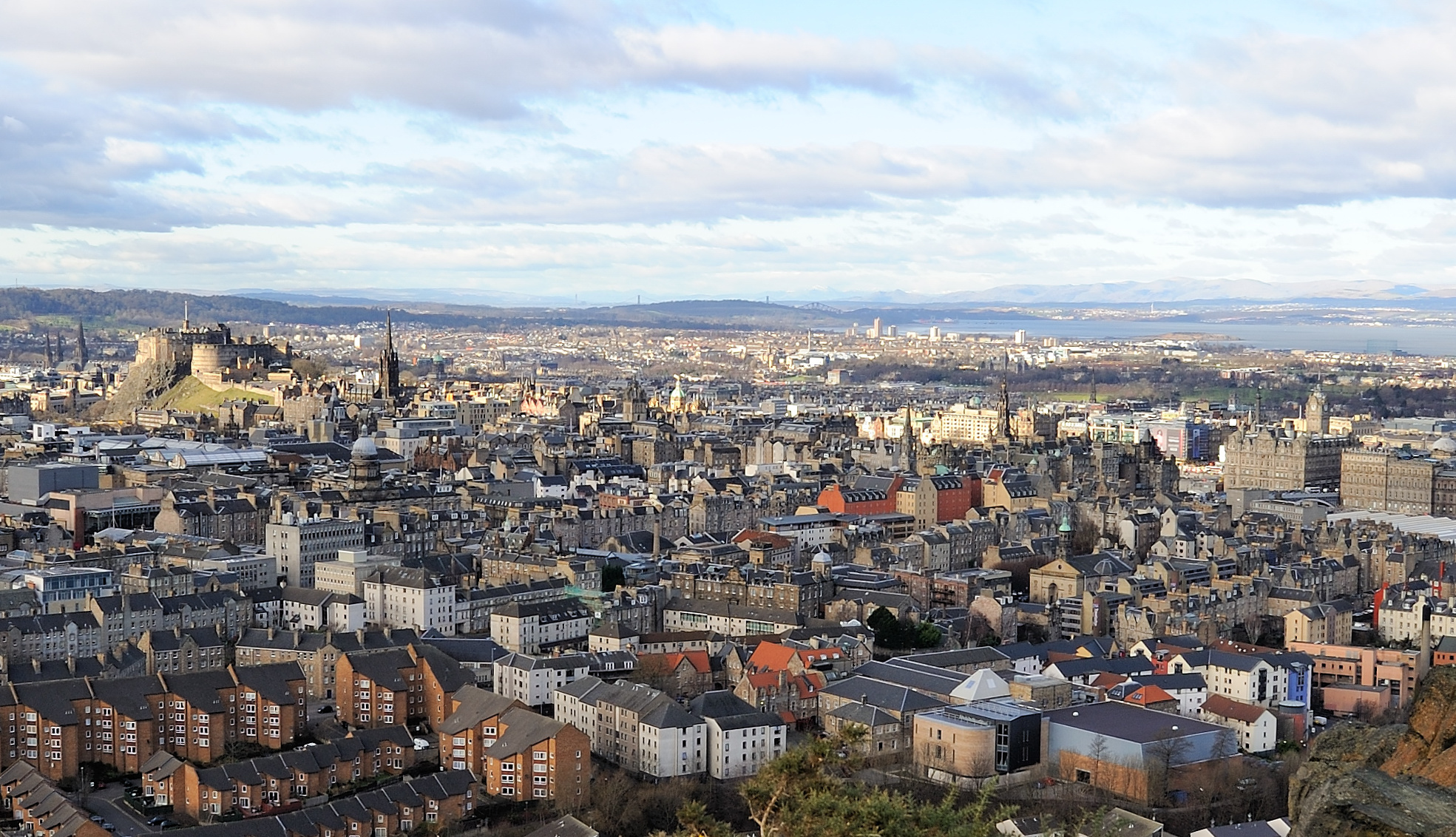
Edinburgh, the capital of Scotland

Municipalities of Scotland

- Capital of Scotland: Edinburgh (outline)
- Largest city: Glasgow
- Largest Metropolitan area: Greater Glasgow
- Cities of Scotland
- Towns in Scotland

==== Demography of Scotland ====
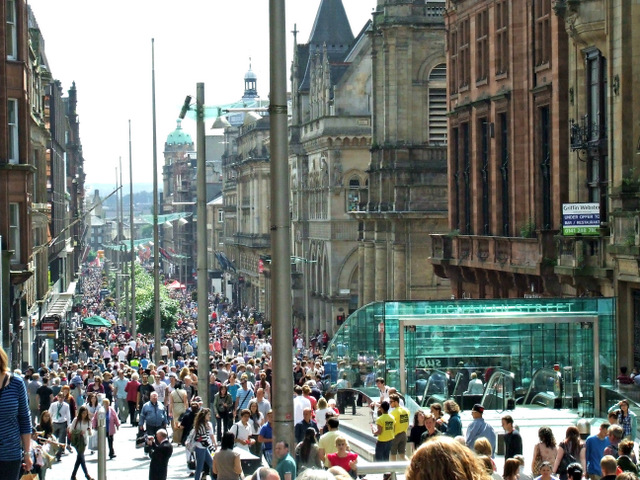
People on Buchanan Street, Glasgow

Demographics of Scotland

- List of census localities in Scotland
- National Records of Scotland
  - General Register Office for Scotland
  - National Archives of Scotland
- Black Scottish people
- Census (Amendment) (Scotland) Act 2019
- New Scot
- Registration of Births, Deaths and Marriages (Scotland) Act 1965
- List of Scottish council areas by number of Scottish Gaelic speakers
- Statistical Accounts of Scotland
- By place
  - Demographics of Edinburgh
  - Demographics of Glasgow

== Government and politics of Scotland ==
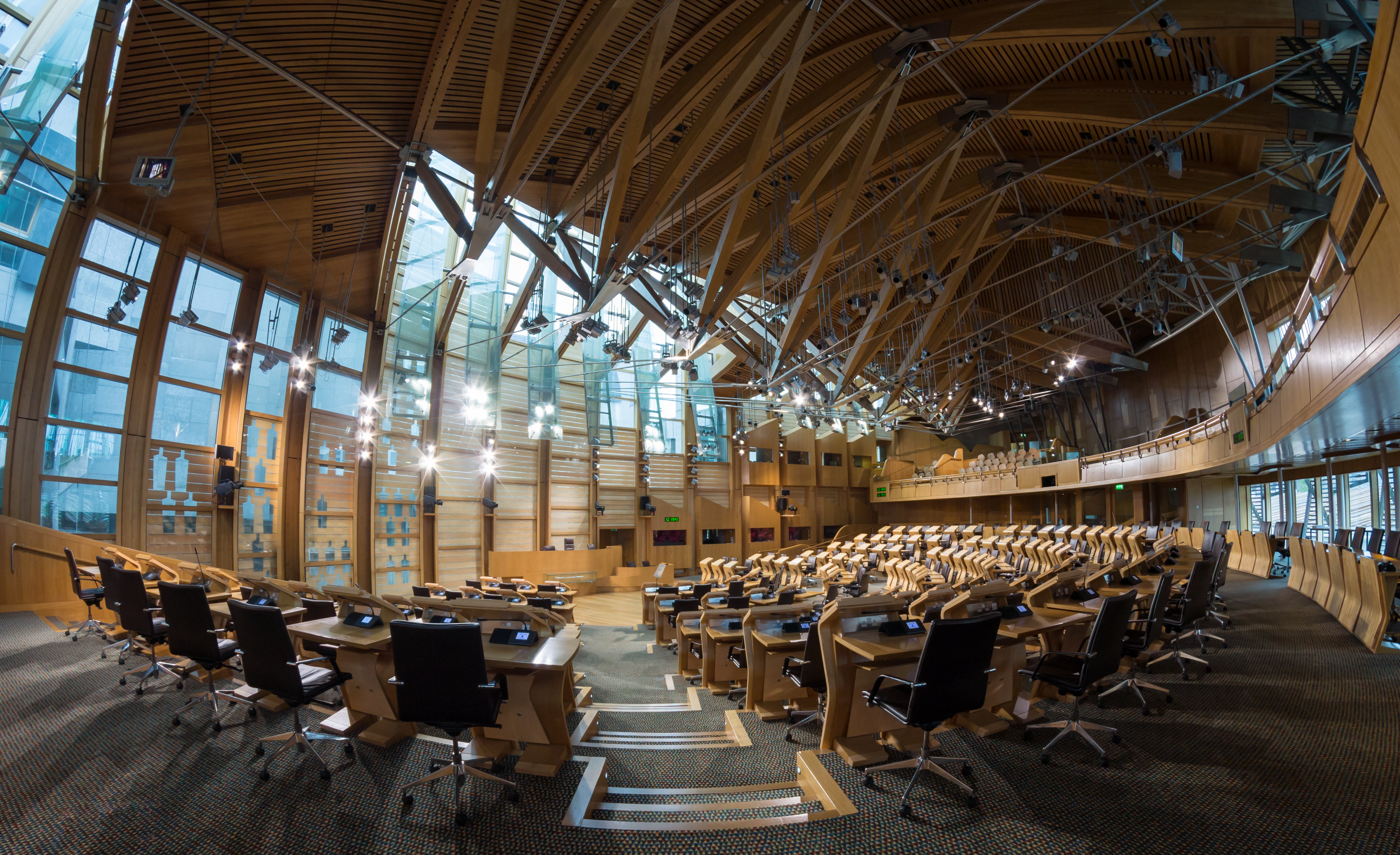
The Scottish Parliament, the national legislature of Scotland

Politics of Scotland

- Form of government: Devolved parliamentary legislature within a constitutional monarchy
- Capital of Scotland: Edinburgh
- Elections in Scotland
  - Electoral systems in Scotland
- List of political parties in Scotland
- Pressure Groups in Scotland
- Scottish independence
  - Fiscal autonomy
  - National Conversation
- Scotland Office (Department of UK Government)
  - Secretary of State for Scotland

=== The Scottish government ===
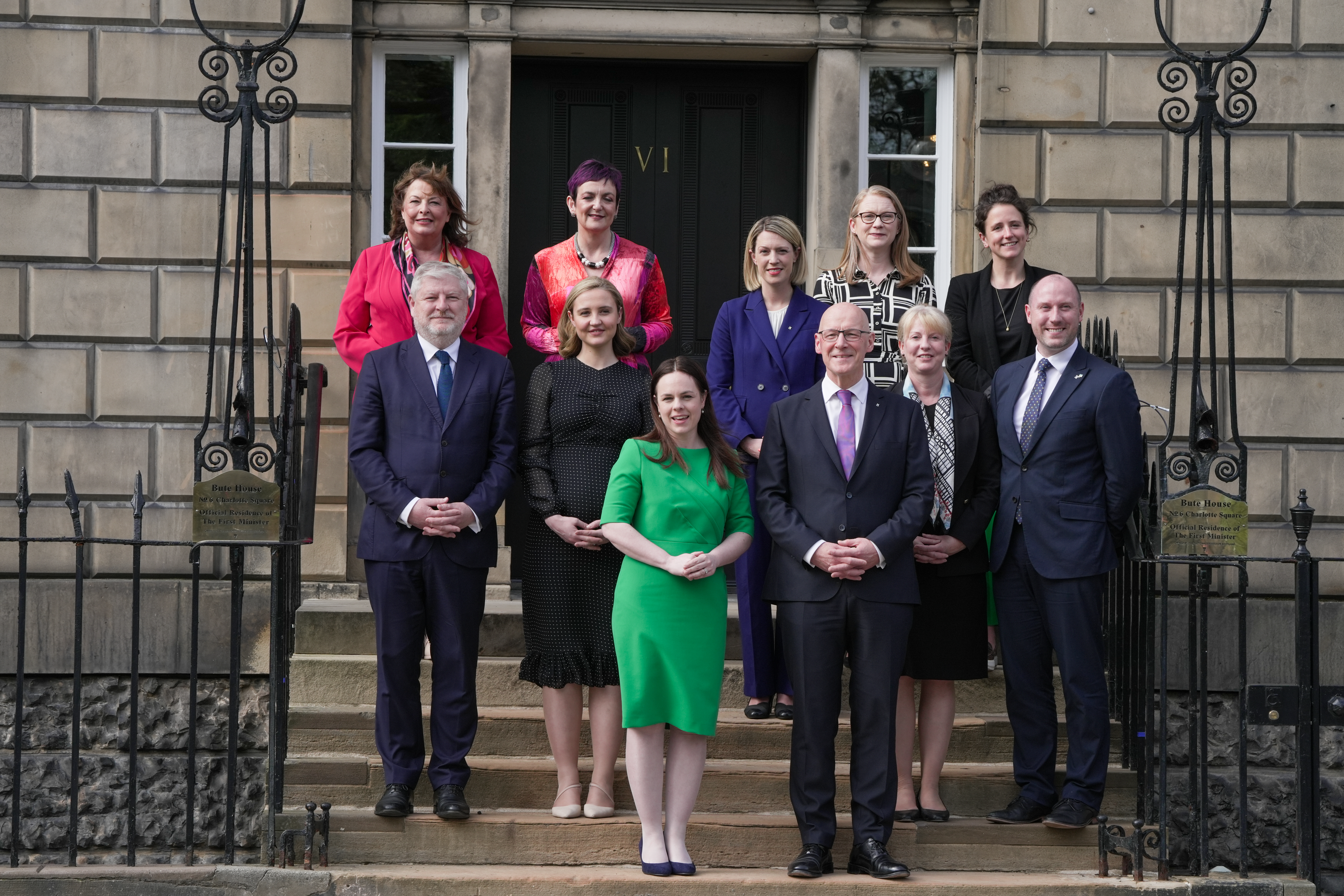
The incumbent Scottish Government, the Swinney government, led by First Minister John Swinney

Government of Scotland

- History of Scottish devolution

==== Government ====
- Head of government: First Minister of Scotland (also the Keeper of the Great Seal of Scotland)
  - Deputy First Minister of Scotland
- Scottish Government
  - Scottish Cabinet
    - Dewar government (1999–2000)
    - McLeish government (2000–01)
    - First McConnell government (2001–03)
    - Second McConnell government (2003–07)
    - First Salmond government (2007–11)
    - Second Salmond government (2011–14)
    - First Sturgeon government (2014–16)
    - Second Sturgeon government (2016–21)
    - Third Sturgeon government (2021–23)
    - First Yousaf government (2023–2024)
    - Second Yousaf government (2024)
    - Swinney government (2024–)
  - International relations of Scotland
- St Andrew's House; main headquarters of the Scottish Government located in Edinburgh
- Bute House; the official residence and workplace of the First Minister

=== Legislative ===
- Scottish Parliament
  - List of acts of the Scottish Parliament from 1999

=== Local government in Scotland ===
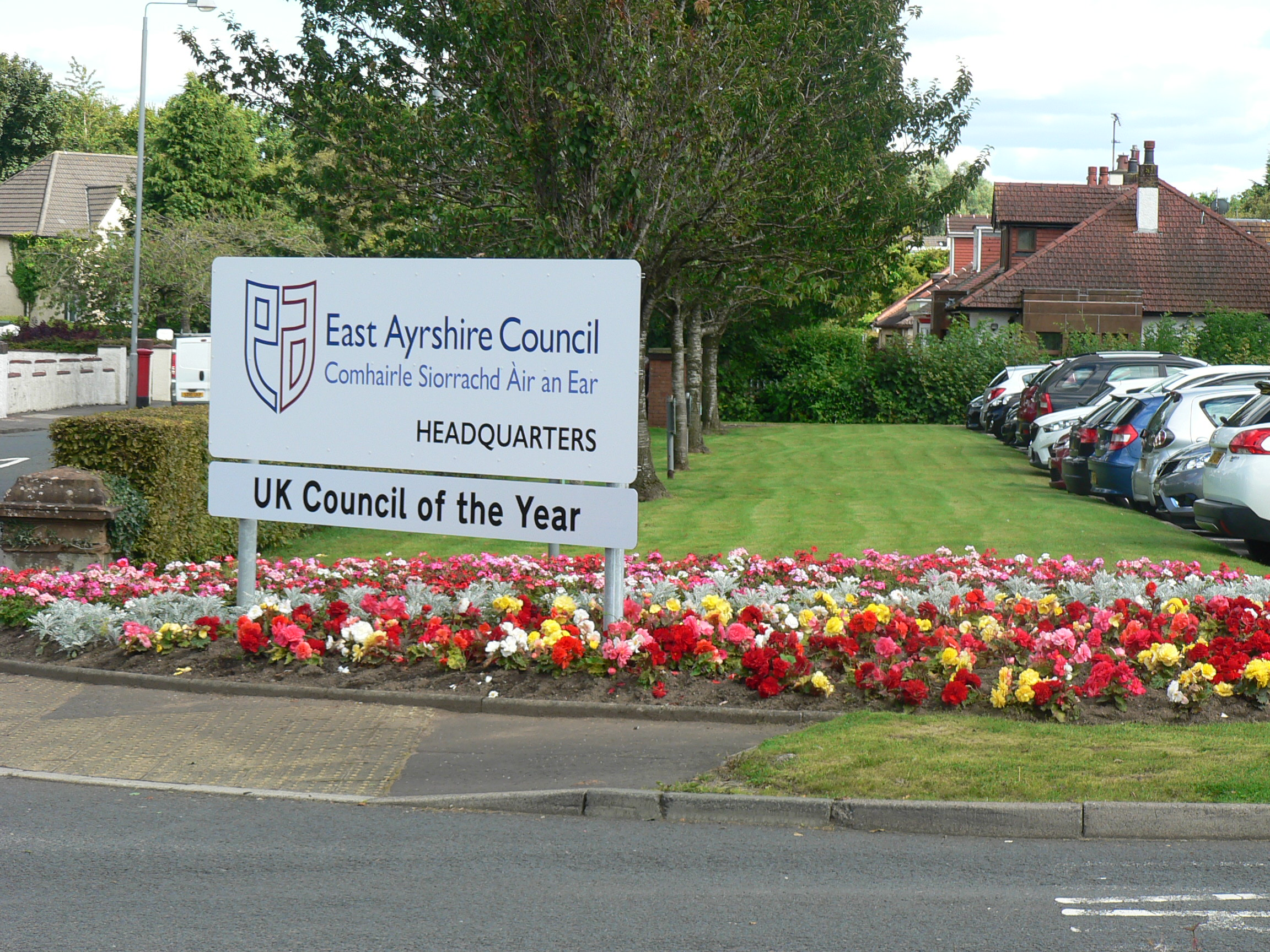
East Ayrshire Council, one of Scotland's 32 council areas

Local government in Scotland

- Local government areas of Scotland
  - History of local government in Scotland
- Local Government (Gaelic Names) (Scotland) Act 1997
- Local Governance (Scotland) Act 2004
- Accounts Commission for Scotland
- Armorial of local councils in Scotland
- Provost
- Lord provost
  - Lieutenancy areas of Scotland

== Legal system ==
Scots law

- Capital punishment in Scotland: There has been a history of capital punishment but it is not used now.
- Human rights in Scotland
  - Freedom of religion in Scotland
  - LGBT rights in Scotland
- Law enforcement in Scotland
  - Police Scotland
  - Scottish Prison Service
    - Prison population of Scotland
- Manrent
- Marriage in Scotland
- Rights of way in Scotland
- Udal law
- College of Justice; includes the Supreme Courts of Scotland
  - High Court of Justiciary; Scotland's supreme criminal court
  - Court of Session; Scotland's supreme civil court
  - Office of the Accountant of Court
  - Lord President of the Court of Session
  - Senator of the College of Justice
    - Supreme Court of the United Kingdom; Scotland's supreme courts can appeal to the Supreme Court of the UK, but Article XIX of the Treaty of Union prevents any higher appeal from a judgment of the High Court of Justiciary in criminal cases
- Sheriff Appeal Court
- Sheriff court
- Justice of the Peace court
- Court of the Lord Lyon
- Scottish Land Court
- Lands Tribunal for Scotland
- Children's hearing
- Courts of Scotland
  - List of courts in Scotland
- Crown Office and Procurator Fiscal Service
- Faculty of Advocates
- Lord Advocate
- Lord President of the Court of Session
- Procurator Fiscal
- Solicitor General for Scotland

== Military ==
- Armed forces in Scotland
  - Scotland had its own military until 1707. Scotland's military merged with the British Armed Forces, with the exception of the Atholl Highlanders.
  - Scots Guards
  - Royal Scots
  - Royal Regiment of Scotland
  - King's Own Scottish Borderers
  - Royal Scots Borderers
  - Royal Highland Fusiliers
  - Black Watch
  - Highlanders (Seaforth, Gordons and Camerons)
  - Argyll and Sutherland Highlanders
  - 51st Highland Volunteers
  - 52nd Lowland Volunteers
    - Band of the Royal Regiment of Scotland
    - Lowland Band of the Royal Regiment of Scotland
- Military history of Scotland

== Census of Scotland ==
1891 Census of Scotland

== History of Scotland ==
- Battles between Scotland and England
- Kingdom of Scotland
  - Parliament of Scotland
  - Peerage of Scotland

=== By period ===
- Timeline of Scottish history
- Prehistoric Scotland
- Timeline of prehistoric Scotland
- Declaration of Arbroath
- List of monarchs of Scotland
- Kingdom of Scotland
- Scotland in the High Middle Ages
- Wars of Scottish Independence
- Scotland in the Late Middle Ages
- Scottish Reformation
- Scottish colonization of the Americas
- Parliament of Scotland
  - List of acts of the Parliament of Scotland
- Treaty of Union 1707
- Jacobitism
- Scottish Enlightenment
- Highland Clearances
- Lowland Clearances

=== By region ===
- History of Angus
- History of Dundee
- History of Edinburgh
- History of Fife
- History of Glasgow
- History of Orkney
- History of the Outer Hebrides

=== By subject ===
- History of education in Scotland
- History of the Jews in Scotland
- History of local government in Scotland
- History of the Scots language
- History of universities in Scotland
- Military history of Scotland

== Culture of Scotland ==
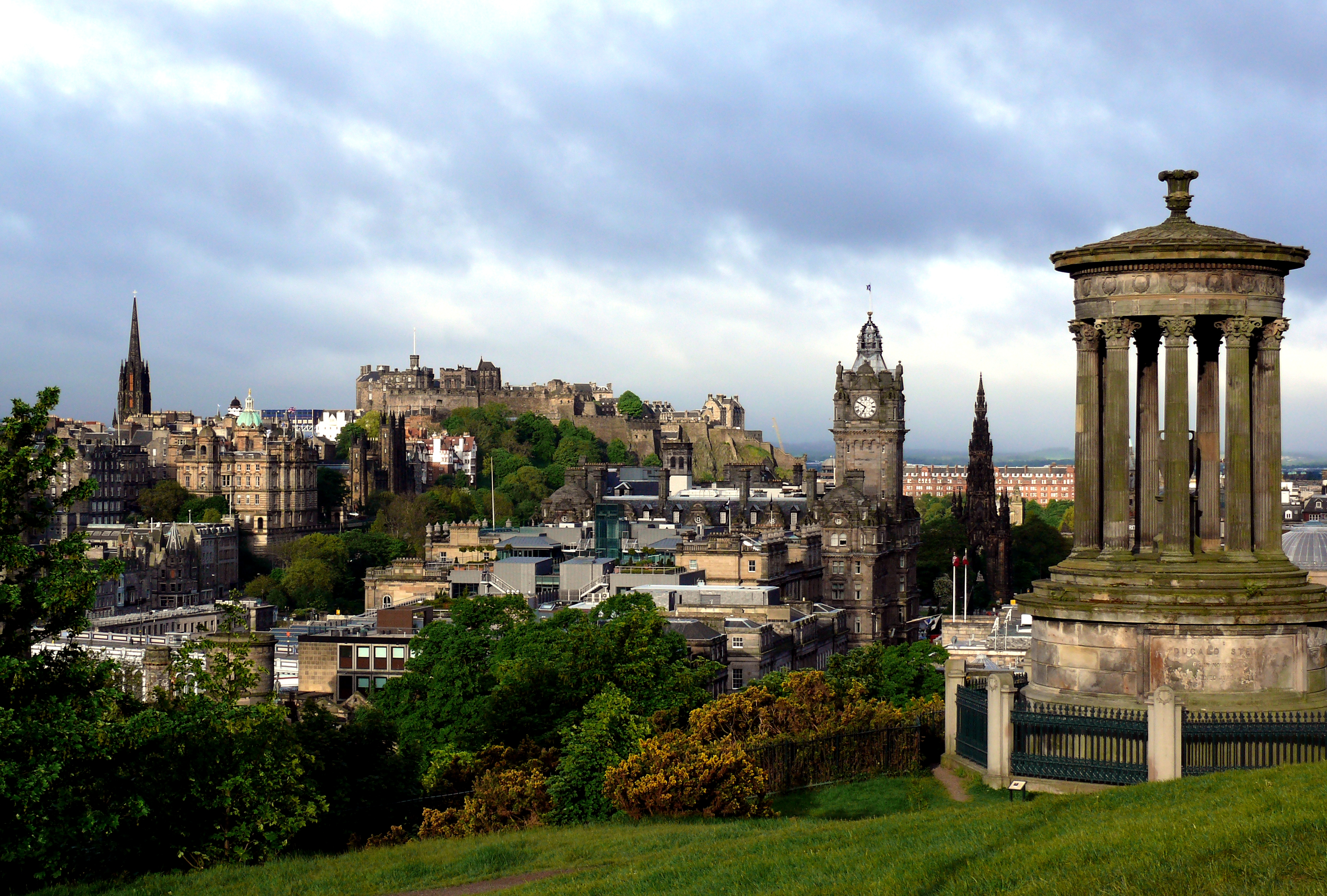
Edinburgh as seen from Calton Hill, with Dugald Stewart Monument

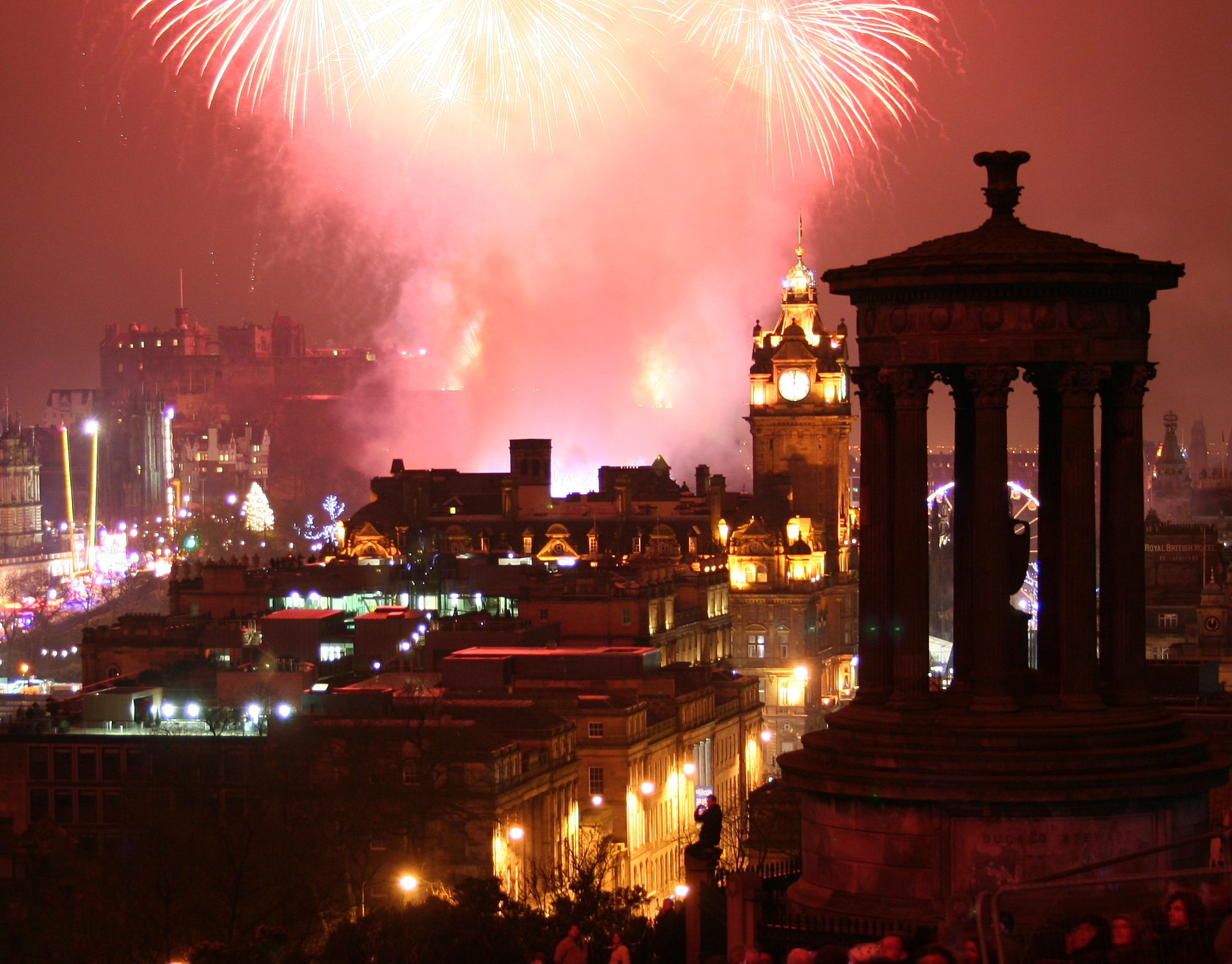
Fireworks over Edinburgh Castle on Hogmanay, the Scottish celebration of the last day of the year (31 December)

Culture of Scotland

- Architecture of Scotland
  - Architecture of Scotland in the Prehistoric era
  - Architecture of Scotland in the Roman era
  - Architecture of Scotland in the Middle Ages
  - Architecture in early modern Scotland
  - Architecture of Scotland in the Industrial Revolution
  - Architecture in modern Scotland
  - Baronial architecture in Scotland
  - Church architecture in Scotland
    - Cathedrals in Scotland
  - Castles in Scotland
    - Castles in Scotland
  - Hill forts in Scotland
  - Historic houses in Scotland
  - Housing in Scotland
- Cuisine of Scotland
  - Harris Tweed
  - Hogmanay
  - Scottish clan
  - Scotch whisky
    - Bean Nighe
  - Tartan
    - Tartan Day (List of tartans)
- Ethnic minorities in Scotland
- Gardens in Scotland
- Festivals in Scotland
- Humour in Scotland
- Inventions and discoveries of Scottish origin
- Languages of Scotland
  - Scottish Gaelic language
  - Lowland Scots
  - Scottish English
  - Highland English
- Marriage in Scotland
  - Civil partnership in Scotland
- Media in Scotland
  - Television in Scotland
- Museums in Scotland
- Mythology of Scotland
- National symbols of Scotland
  - Coat of arms of Scotland
  - Flag of Scotland
  - National anthem of Scotland
- Prostitution in Scotland
- Public holidays in Scotland
  - Christmas in Scotland
- Scottish national identity
- World Heritage Sites in Scotland

=== Art in Scotland ===
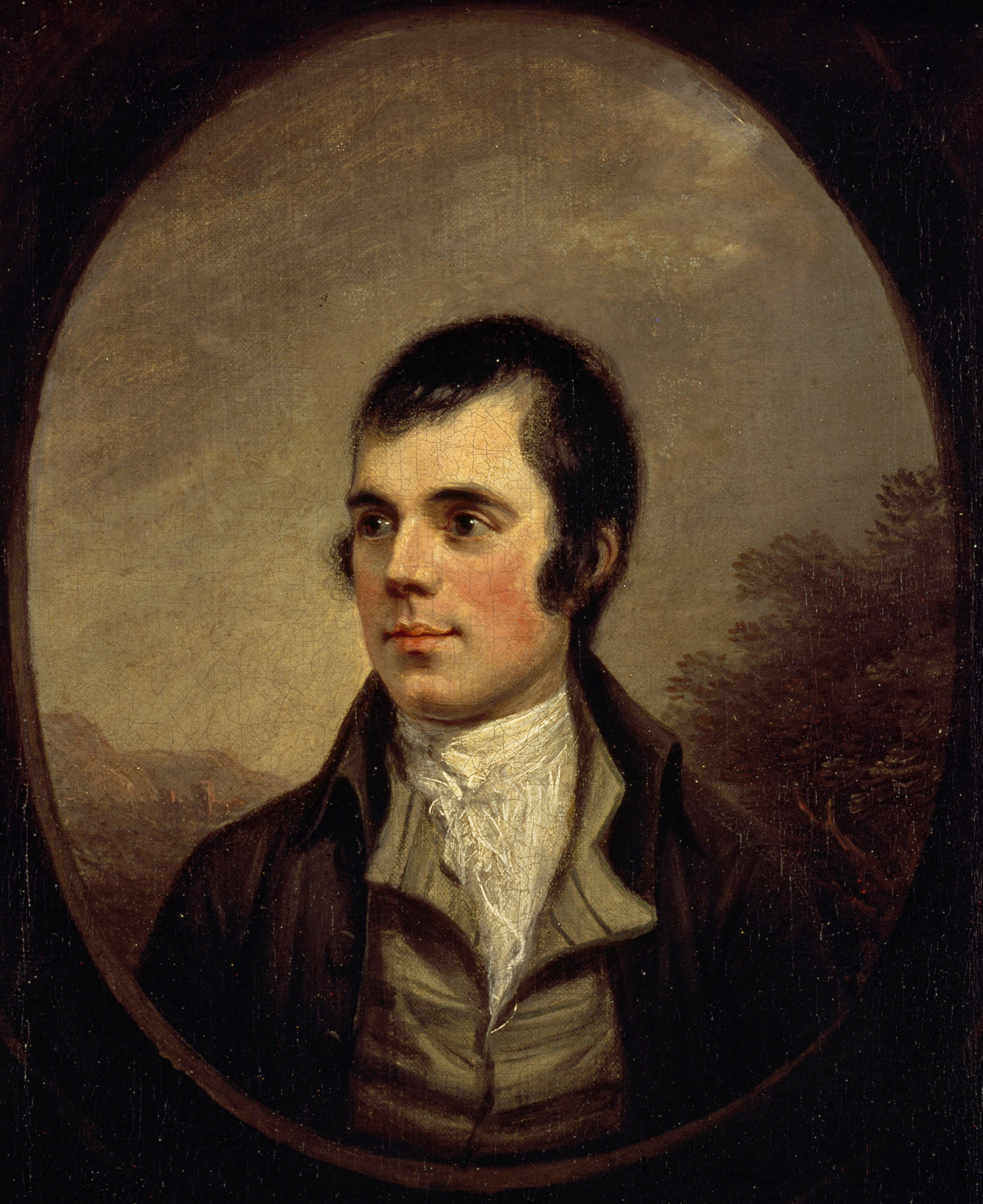
Robert Burns, Scotland's national poet

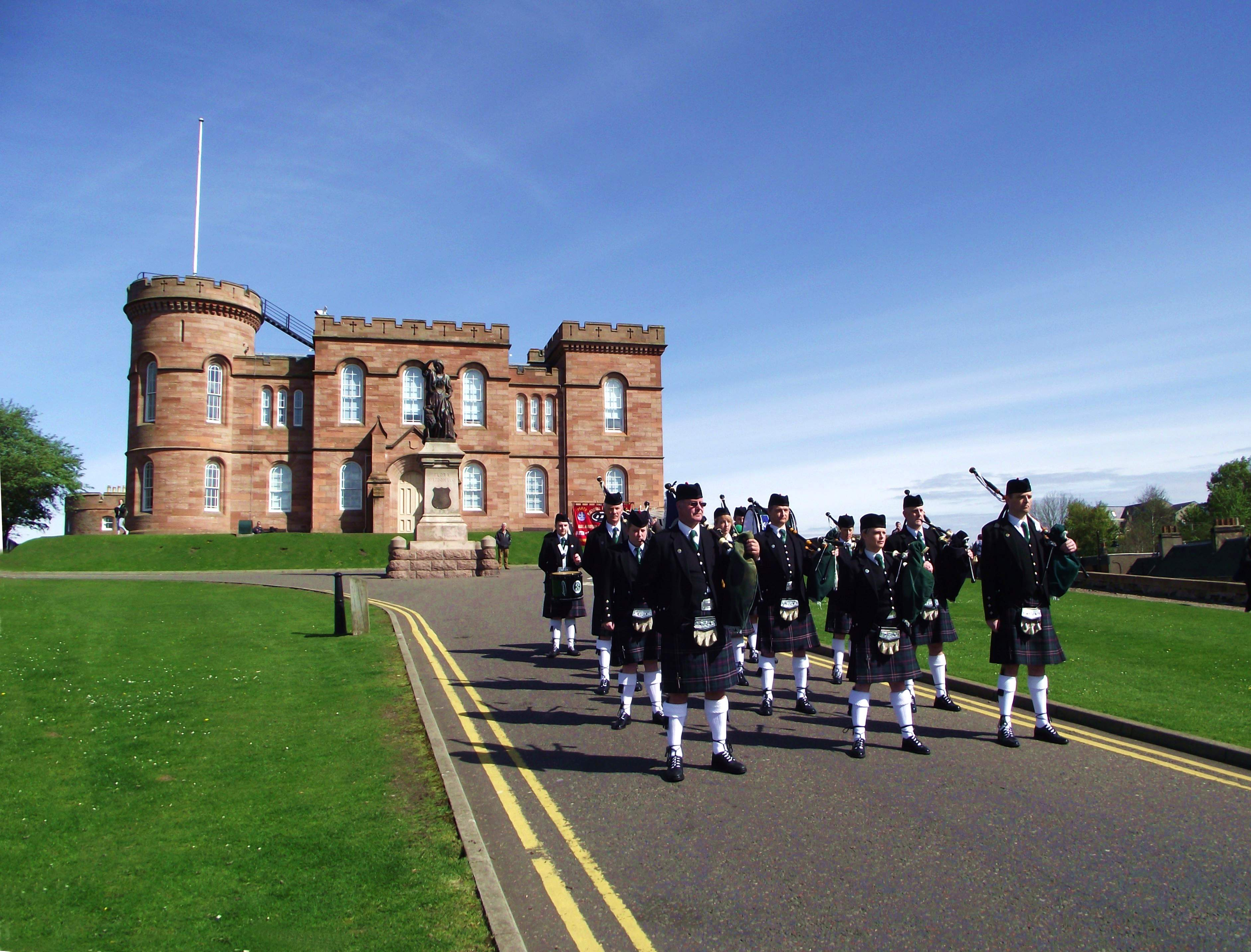
Pipe band at Inverness Castle

- Scottish art
  - Celtic art
  - Migration Period art
  - National Gallery of Scotland
- Cinema of Scotland
- Comedy in Scotland
- Dance in Scotland
  - Scottish country dance
  - Scottish highland dance
  - Ghillies
  - Jig
  - Scottish sword dances
    - Dirk dance
- Literature of Scotland
  - Robert Burns; Scotland's national poet, best known for "Auld Lang Syne", written in the Scots language and commonly sung internationally at New Years
  - Scottish writers
  - Ossian
- Music of Scotland
  - Bagpipes
    - Great Highland bagpipe
    - Pipe band
  - Church music in Scotland
  - Classical music in Scotland
  - Court music in Scotland
  - Folk music of Scotland
  - Music of Scotland in the nineteenth century
  - Opera in Scotland
  - Scottish country dance music
- Scottish photography
- Theatre in Scotland
  - Scottish Playwrights

=== People of Scotland ===
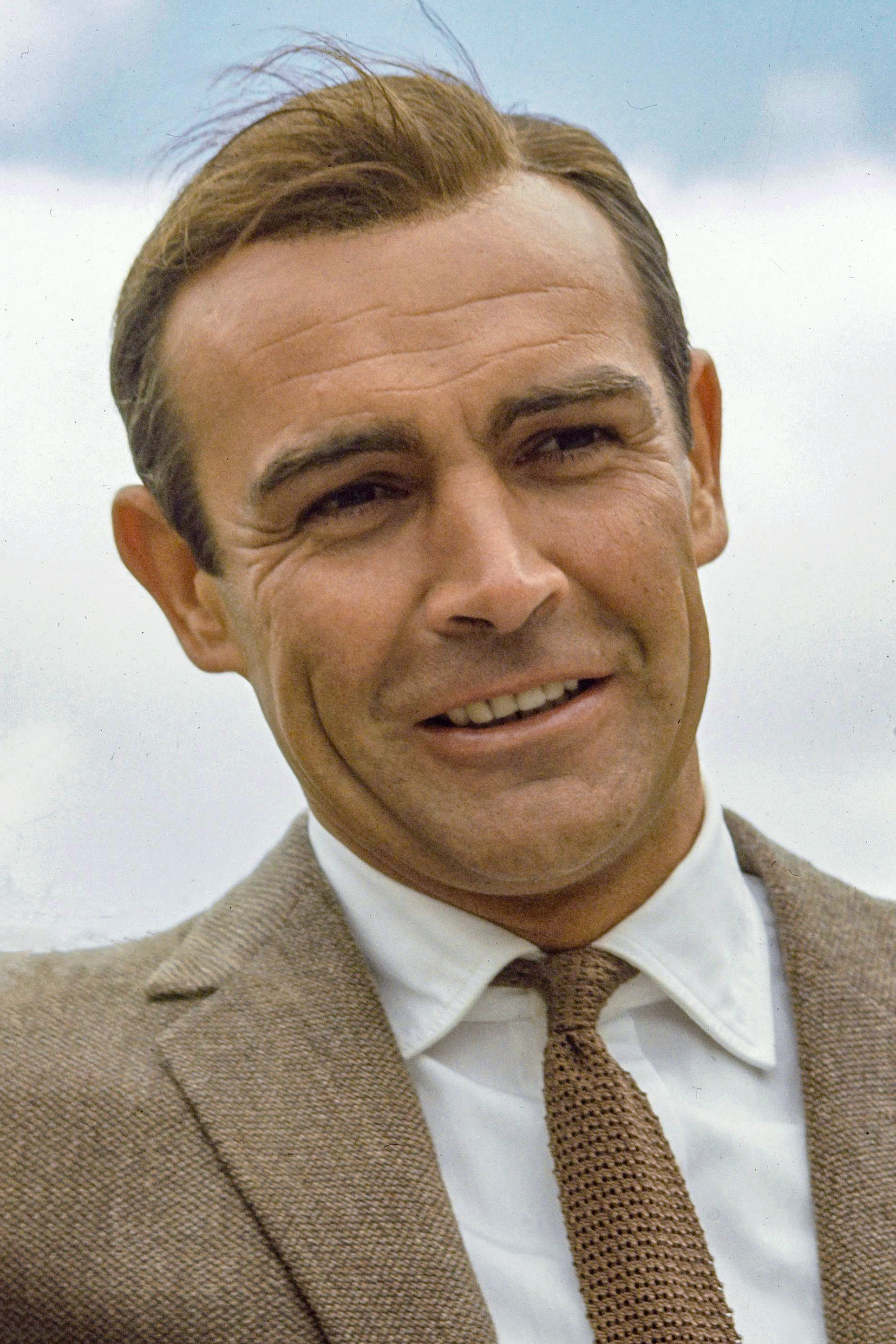
Sean Connery, the inaugural actor to play fictional MI5 agent James Bond on screen

- Scottish people
  - Celt
  - Gaels
  - Modern Celts
- Lists of Scots
  - List of monarchs of Scotland
    - List of Queens of Scotland
    - Scottish monarchs family tree
  - List of Scottish musicians
  - List of Scottish novelists
  - List of Scottish scientists
  - List of Scottish writers
- Scottish surnames

=== Religion in Scotland ===
- Religion in Scotland
  - Buddhism in Scotland
  - Christianity in Scotland
    - Baptist Union of Scotland
    - Scottish Episcopal Church
    - Church of Scotland
      - General Assembly of the Church of Scotland
        - List of moderators of the General Assembly of the Church of Scotland
    - Roman Catholicism in Scotland
  - Hinduism in Scotland
  - Judaism in Scotland
  - Islam in Scotland
  - History of the Jews in Scotland
    - List of Scottish Jews
  - Sikhism in Scotland

=== Sports in Scotland ===
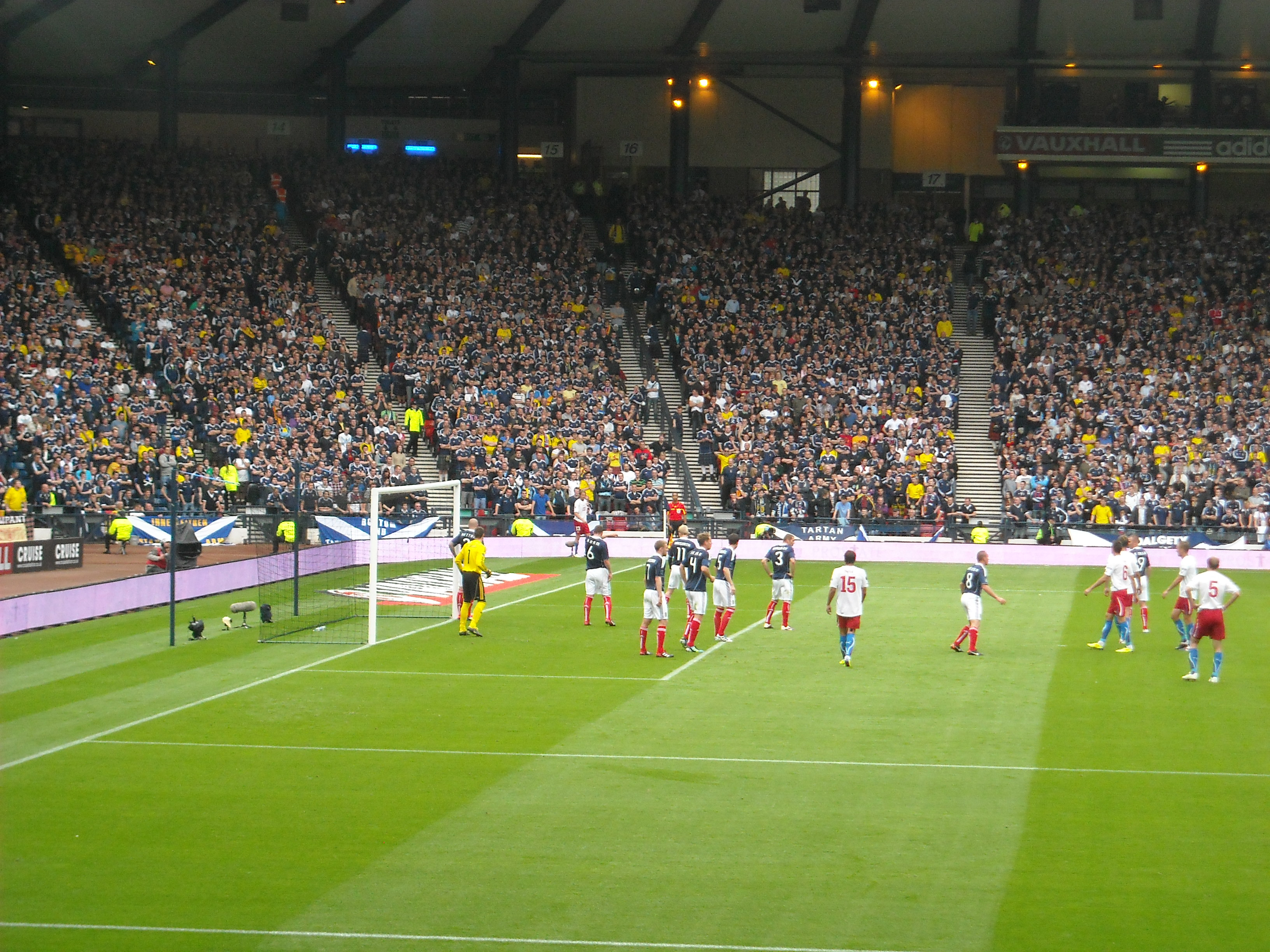
The Scotland national football team in competition against the Czech Republic at Euro 2012. Scotland competes at the FIFA World Cup, UEFA Nations League and UEFA European Championship

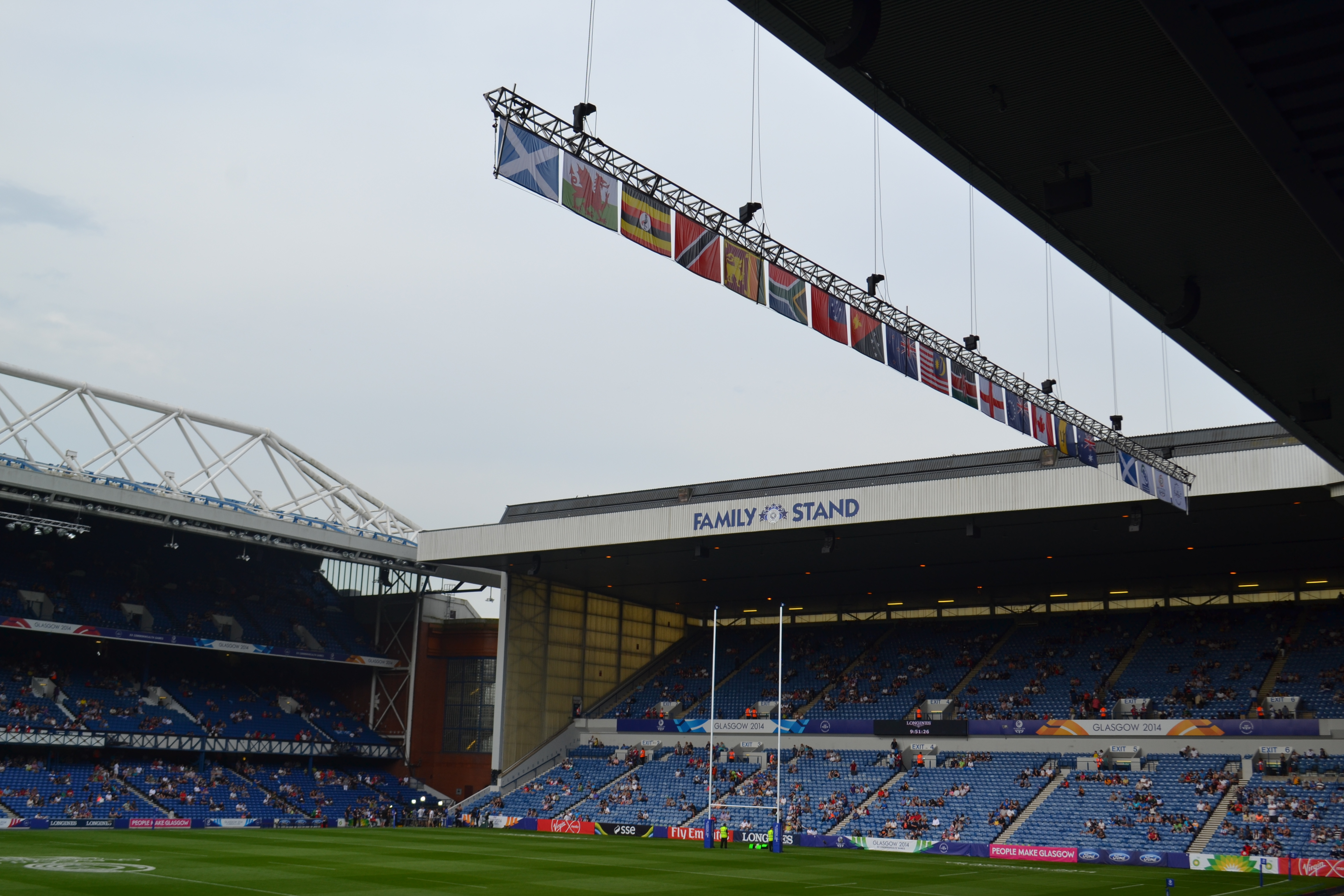
Scotland has competed in every Commonwealth Games since 1930, and hosted three times; 1970, 1986 and 2014

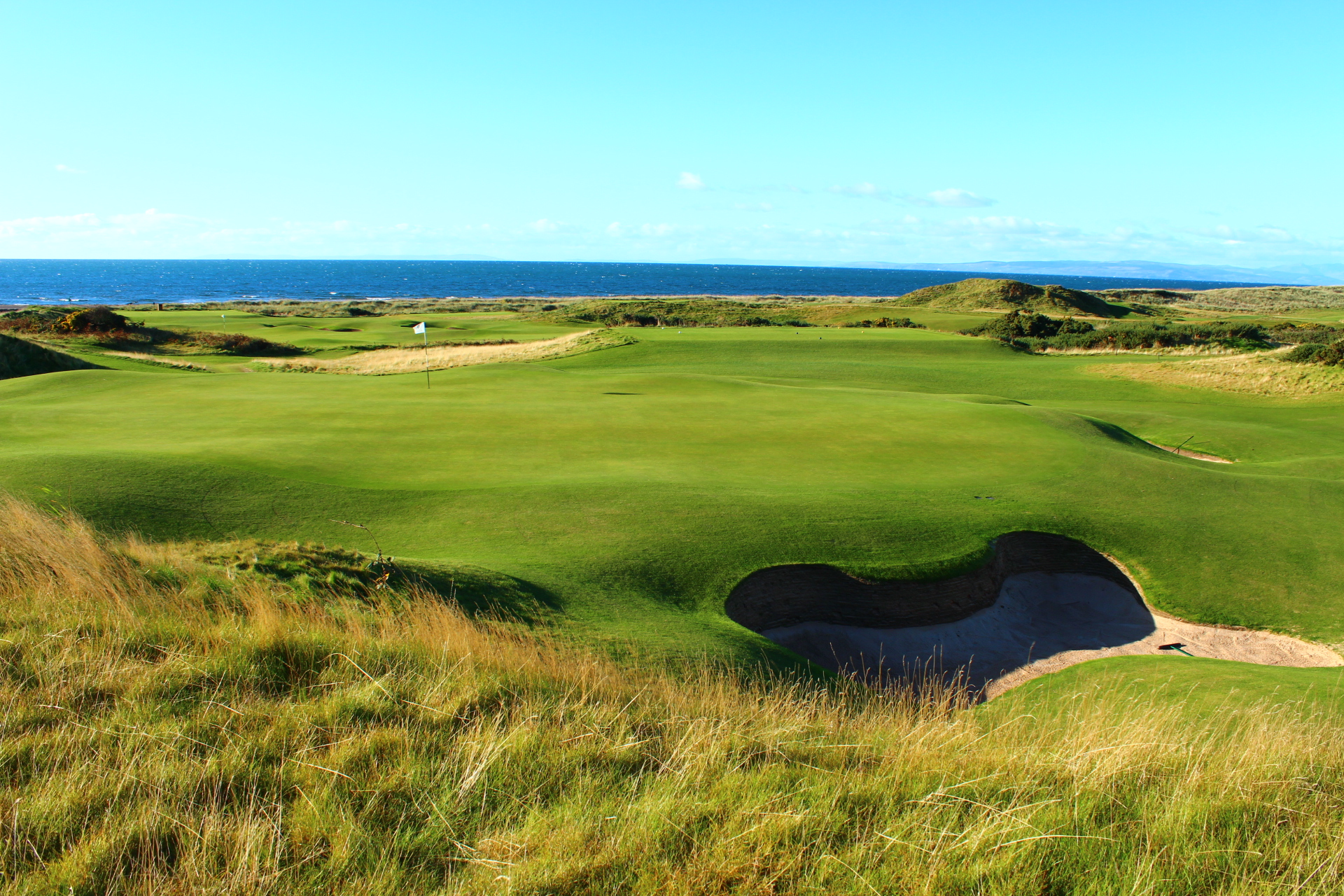
Turnberry Golf Course

Sports in Scotland

- American football in Scotland
  - Scottish Claymores
- Australian rules football in Scotland
- Basketball in Scotland
  - Scotland national basketball team
- Chess in Scotland
  - Scottish Chess Federation
- Commonwealth Games Council for Scotland
- Cricket in Scotland
  - Scottish national cricket team
- Curling
- Field Hockey in Scotland
  - Scotland women's national field hockey team
- Football in Scotland
  - Scotland national football team
  - Scotland women's national football team
  - Scottish Football Association
  - Scottish Professional Football League
  - Scottish Cup
- Scotland GAA
- Golf in Scotland
  - The R&A
  - Moray Golf Club
  - The Royal and Ancient Golf Club of St Andrews
- Highland Games
  - Tossing the caber
- Lacrosse in Scotland
- National sports teams of Scotland
- Netball
  - Scotland national netball team
- Campaign for a Scottish Olympic Team – Scotland does not compete at the Olympic Games, Scottish athletes compete as part of the Great Britain team instead. There is however a long running campaign to get a team.
- Rugby in Scotland
  - Rugby league in Scotland
  - Rugby union in Scotland
    - Scottish Rugby Union
    - Scotland national rugby union team
    - History of rugby union in Scotland
    - Murrayfield Stadium
    - List of Scottish rugby union players
    - Rugby union in the Borders
  - Rugby Sevens (invented in Scotland)
    - Edinburgh Sevens
    - Melrose Sevens
- Shinty
  - Camanachd Association
  - Composite rules shinty-hurling
  - Women's shinty

== Economy and infrastructure of Scotland ==
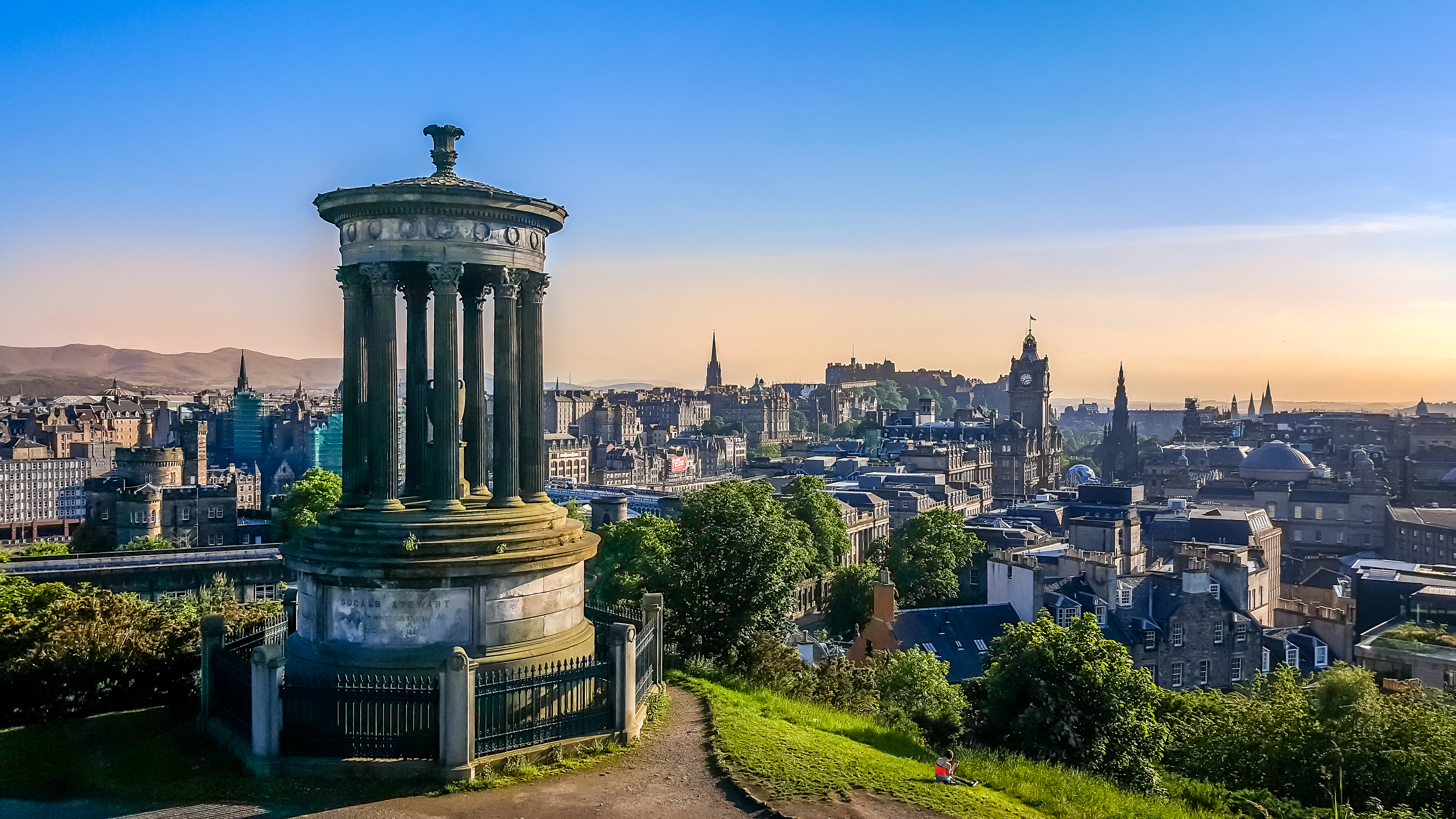
Edinburgh, Scotland's capital city, is the 13th-largest financial centre in the world and 4th largest in Europe in 2020

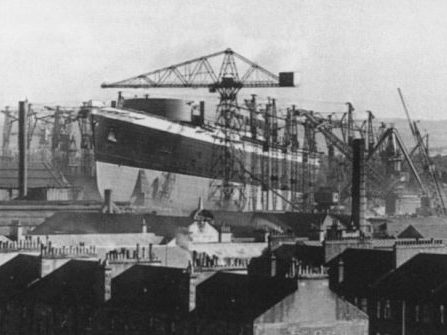
RMS Queen Elizabeth on the slipway at Clydebank, circa 1938.

- Economy of Scotland
  - Economic rank (by nominal GDP): (6th; 2023), as a country of the United Kingdom
  - Agriculture in Scotland
  - Banking in Scotland
    - Bank of Scotland
    - Royal Bank of Scotland
    - Clydesdale Bank
- Communications in Scotland
  - Scottish media
  - List of newspapers in Scotland
  - Television in Scotland
    - BBC Scotland
    - STV
  - Internet in Scotland
    - .scot
- Companies of Scotland
- Currency of the United Kingdom: Pound Sterling
- Economic history of Scotland
- Energy in Scotland
  - Energy policy of Scotland
  - Oil industry in Scotland
    - North Sea Oil
  - Power stations in Scotland
  - Renewable energy in Scotland
  - Nuclear power in Scotland
- Fire services in Scotland
- Health care in Scotland
  - Hospitals in Scotland
  - NHS Scotland
    - Scottish Ambulance Service
- Mining in Scotland
  - Gold mining in Scotland
  - Lead mining in Scotland
  - National Mining Museum Scotland
- Tourism in Scotland
- Transport in Scotland
  - Airports in Scotland
  - Ports and harbours in Scotland
  - Rail transport in Scotland
  - Roads in Scotland
- Water supply and sanitation in Scotland
- Wild Scotland

== Education in Scotland ==
- Education in Scotland
  - Curriculum for Excellence, the national 3–18 school curriculum
  - Education Scotland
  - Care Inspectorate
  - General Teaching Council for Scotland
  - Cabinet Secretary for Education and Skills
- List of universities in Scotland
- List of schools in Scotland
- Scottish Qualifications Authority (SQA)

=== Specific schools ===
- State schools in Scotland
  - State schools in City Council Areas
  - State schools in Council Areas A–D
  - State schools in Council Areas E–H
  - State schools in Council Areas I–R
  - State schools in Council Areas S–W
- Private schools in Scotland
- Gaelic medium schools in Scotland
- Catholic schools in Scotland
- Universities

== See also ==
- Outline of geography
- Outline of the United Kingdom
- List of international rankings
