= List of ecoregions in Scotland =

Below is a list of ecoregions in Scotland.

== Terrestrial ==
=== Temperate broadleaf and mixed forests ===
- Celtic broadleaf forests
- Celtic rainforest

=== Temperate coniferous forests ===
- Caledonian Forest

== Fresh water ==
- Central & Western Europe
- Northern British Isles

== Flora and conditions ==
The principal plant communities of the Celtic broadleaf forests include:

- lowland to submontane acidophilous oak forests,
- mixed oak forests, principally of English oak (Quercus robur) and sessile oak (Quercus petraea).
- mixed oak-ash forests.

Plant communities with smaller areas include:

- western boreal and nemoral-montane birch forests,
- fen and swamp forests,
- ombrotrophic mires in northern England and southern Scotland.

In addition to the two native oak species (Quercus robur and Q. petraea), broad-leafed deciduous trees include common ash, silver birch, European aspen, and common elm.

Small annual temperature variation, high humidity, and high levels of annual precipitation makes Celtic Rainforest an important habitat for numerous common and rare species of mosses, liverworts, and lichens. The Scottish Natural History Scientific Advisory Committee writes, "the whole area is a lichenologists’ Mecca". There is an exceptional number of epiphytic plants (plants growing on or hanging from trees without being parasitic). The ground is covered with a deep blanketing of mosses and liverworts, which rise up the trunks of the trees onto the horizontal branches and up into the canopy.

== See also ==
- Environment of Scotland
- Flora of Scotland
- Fauna of Scotland
