= Wild Scotland =

- Founded: 2003
- Type: Non-profit organisation
- Location: Inverness, Scotland
- Region served: Scotland
- Website: Wild Scotland

Wild Scotland is the Scottish Wildlife and Nature Tourism Operators Association - a not-for-profit organisation made up of wildlife and nature tourism professionals.

Formed in 2003 the association has more than 80 members which represents one quarter of Scotland's wildlife tourism businesses.
