= Civil partnership in Scotland =

Civil partnerships have been recognised for same-sex couples in Scotland since 2005 following the enactment of the Civil Partnership Act 2004. The Act gives same-sex couples most (but not all) of the rights and responsibilities of civil marriage.

On 4 February 2014, Scotland became the 17th country to permit marriage between same-sex individuals. Since the Scottish Government had announced a consultation on legalising same-sex marriage in September 2011, the Government's initial view was stated to be in favour of legalisation of both civil and religious same-sex marriage, but allowing religious bodies to opt out of performing same-sex marriages if they so wished. As passed in 2014, the law establishing marriage equality in Scotland did not require religious institutions to hold ceremonies on their premises.

== Move towards equal marriage ==
The consultation of 2011 provoked widespread debate and garnered 50,000 responses. The Equality Network gathered over 20,000 responses in favour of the change with a significant majority (18,500) submitted via the Equality Network's Equal Marriage consultation website. Scotland For Marriage, a coalition of religious bodies opposed to the change, submitted around 20,000 postcards to the Scottish Government in addition to a 9,000 signature petition.

After analysis of the responses, the Scottish Government announced it intended to go ahead with the legalisation of same-sex marriages, though with plans to put in safeguards to prevent religious bodies that do not wish to carry out such ceremonies from being prosecuted. They found that, of respondents in Scotland, 36% of those were in favour and 64% against the proposals when considering all submissions - standard responses, postcards and petitions. When standard responses alone were considered, 65% were in favour and 35% against the proposals.

The Marriage and Civil Partnerships (Scotland) Bill was put before the Scottish Parliament at the end of June 2013 and passed in February 2014.

== Background ==
Civil partnerships have been recognised for same-sex couples in Scotland since 2005 following the enactment of the Civil Partnership Act 2004. The Act gives same-sex couples most (but not all) of the rights and responsibilities of civil marriage. Civil partners are entitled to the same property rights as married opposite-sex couples, the same exemption as married couples on inheritance tax, social security and pension benefits, and also the ability to get parental responsibility for a partner's children, as well as responsibility for reasonable maintenance of one's partner and their children, tenancy rights, full life insurance recognition, next of kin rights in hospitals, and others. There is a formal process for dissolving partnerships akin to divorce.

The legalisation of same-sex marriage in Scotland has had several notable impacts on legislation relating to Scottish civil partnerships. The Scottish Government has elected to introduce:

- Possible tests for religious and belief bodies to meet when solemnising marriages or registering civil partnerships, in light of increasing concerns over sham and forced marriages.
- Religious and belief ceremonies to register civil partnerships.

Since November 2015, civil partnerships originating elsewhere in the United Kingdom other than Scotland (including Northern Ireland) can be converted to a marriage without the couple being forced to dissolve the civil partnership. In June 2020, the Scottish Parliament passed legislation opening civil partnerships to different-sex couples.

== Statistics ==
According to the National Records of Scotland, 6,014 same-sex civil partnerships were registered in Scotland between 2005 and 2022. By Scottish council area, most same-sex partnerships were performed in the City of Edinburgh (1,559), followed by Glasgow City (1,160), Dumfries and Galloway (609), Fife (276), Highland (222), Aberdeen City (194), Argyll and Bute (157), Perth and Kinross (153), Dundee City (139), South Lanarkshire (121), Stirling (118), Aberdeenshire (116), the Scottish Borders (115), North Ayrshire (106), South Ayrshire (99) and West Lothian (99), North Lanarkshire (95), East Lothian (93), Falkirk (83), Renfrewshire (69), Moray (60), Midlothian (54), Angus (53), West Dunbartonshire (52), East Dunbartonshire (50), East Ayrshire (43) and East Renfrewshire (43), Clackmannanshire (33), Inverclyde (27), the Orkney Islands (7) and the Shetland Islands (7), and Na h-Eileanan Siar (2).

== Same–sex marriage ==
Same-sex marriage has been legal in Scotland since 16 December 2014. As family law is not reserved to the Parliament of the United Kingdom, the Scottish Parliament has legislative competence to make changes to the law on marriage. A same-sex marriage law was approved by the Scottish Parliament in February 2014 and received royal assent on 12 March 2014. It came into effect on 16 December with many civil partners converting their relationships into marriages, while the first same-sex marriage ceremonies occurred on 31 December 2014. Civil partnerships for same-sex couples have been legal in Scotland since 2005.

== See also ==
- Same-sex marriage in Scotland
- Marriage in Scotland
- Scottish Parliament
  - Marriage and Civil Partnership (Scotland) Act 2014
