= Scottish photography =

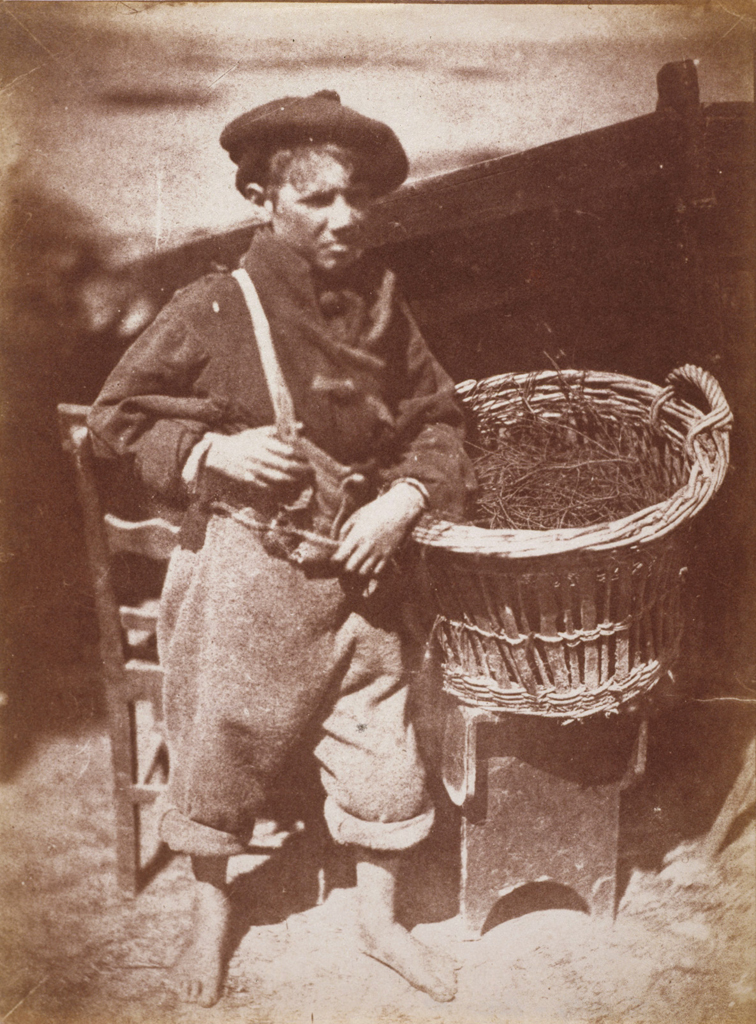
'His Faither's Breeks', by Hill & Adamson

Scotland played a major role in the technical development of photography in the nineteenth century through the efforts of figures including James Clerk Maxwell and David Brewster. Its artistic development was pioneered by Robert Adamson and artist David Octavius Hill, whose work is considered to be some of the first and finest artistic uses of photography. Thomas Roger was one of the first commercial photographers. Thomas Keith was one of the first architectural photographers. George Washington Wilson pioneered instant photography and landscape photography. Clementina Hawarden and Mary Jane Matherson were amongst the first female photographers. War photography was pioneered by James MacCosh, James Robertson, Alexander Gardner and Mairi Chisholm.

In the early twentieth century notable photographic work in Scotland included that of visiting artists, such as Alvin Langdon Coburn and Paul Strand. There was also the record of the Gorbals in Glasgow made by Bert Hardy, Joseph MacKenzie and Oscar Marzaroli. Having pioneered photography in the late nineteenth century, the artistic attainment of native photographers was not high in the early twentieth century. In the late twentieth century, photography in Scotland enjoyed a renaissance, encouraged by figures including Richard Hough and Murray Johnston. More recent exponents who have received acclaim include Pradip Malde, Maud Sulter and Owen Logan.

Scotland lacks a national gallery of photography, but there are the dedicated Stills and Portfolio galleries in Edinburgh and space dedicated to photography at the Scottish National Portrait Gallery and the Street Level Gallery in Glasgow. Photography is taught at degree and further education level in Scotland and the history of photography is usually taught within the context of art history.

== History ==
=== Technical origins ===
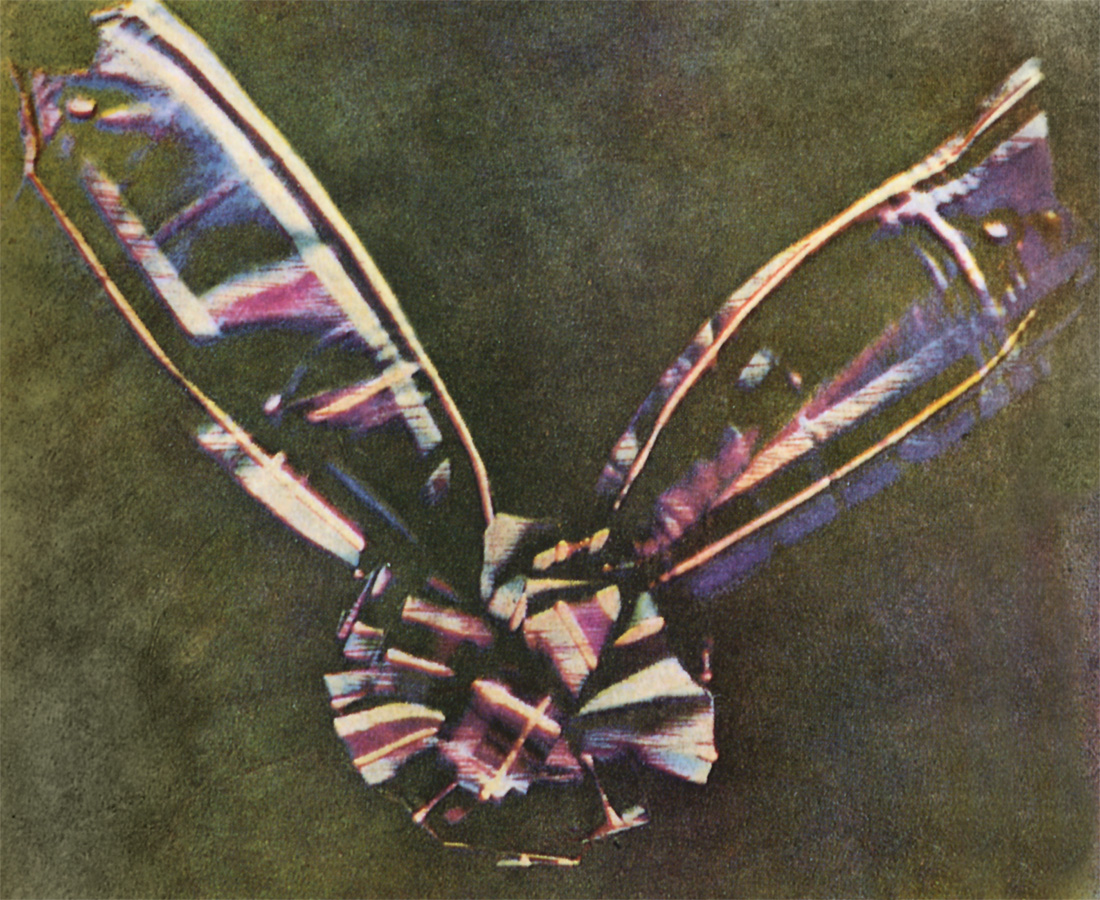
The world's first colour photograph, made by the Scottish scientist James Clerk Maxwell in 1861, was of a tartan ribbon.

In the early nineteenth century Scottish scientists David Brewster (1781–1868) and James Clerk Maxwell (1831–79) played a major part in the development of the techniques of photography. Brewster was an expert on optics and had refined the microscope and invented the kaleidoscope. He collaborated with a number of figures, including Henry Fox Talbot (1800–77), who had developed the calotype photographic process. Maxwell was among the first scientists to investigate colour and produced the first colour photograph in 1861, displayed by using three magic lantern projectors with different colour filters.

=== Artistic development ===
According to photo historian David Burn "there is a good case to be made for the proposition that the greatest contribution that Scotland has made to the visual arts, possibly to the arts as a whole, is in the art of photography". A circle of scientists and artists gathered around Brewster in Edinburgh with the objective of refining the science and art of photography. In 1839 of the five examples of the daguerreotype and twenty "Photogenic Drawings" by Talbot were shown at the Exhibition of Arts, Manufacturers and Practical Sciences at the Assembly Rooms, Edinburgh. In 1841 four more daguerreotypes were displayed at the annual exhibition of the Royal Scottish Academy. By 1843 the Edinburgh Calotype Club had been formed, probably the world's first photographic club. The club dissolved in the mid-1850s as new processes appeared, such as the albumen print and wet collodion process. The Glasgow Photographic Society was founded in 1855, The Photographic Society of Scotland formed in 1856 and the Edinburgh Photographic Society in 1861.

Members of the Edinburgh Calotype Club included chemist Robert Adamson (1821–48) and artist David Octavius Hill (1821–70), who as Hill & Adamson formed the first photographic studio in Scotland at Rock House in Edinburgh in 1843. They originally worked together with the aim of recording the members of the Disruption Assembly, which saw the division of the Church of Scotland in 1843, for a large composite painting, but soon the photographs themselves became a major medium. Their output of around 3,000 calotype images in four years are considered some of the first and finest artistic uses of photography. They produced images influenced by genre art included their Edinburgh Ale (1843–46), where the poses of three drinking companions are based on scenes from Dutch art. Hill and Adamson also pioneered the recording of rural life as a suitable subject for photography, recording the fisher folk of Newhaven, near Edinburgh. Adamson trained Thomas Roger (1833–88) of St. Andrews, who was one of the first commercial photographers and beside commercial portraits, produced many genre style compositions.

Other pioneers included Thomas Annan (1829–87), who took portraits and landscapes, and whose photographs of the Glasgow slums were among the first to use the medium as a social record. Annan also pioneered the recording of industrial change, photographing the pumping stations and canals of the new waterways to Glasgow in the 1850s. The theme of industrial development was taken up by Evelyn Carey (1858–1932), who recorded step-by-step the building of the Forth Railway Bridge. Also interested in urban landscapes was Archibald Burns, who occupied part of the Rock House studio and whose The Horse Wynd and The Cowgate (both 1871) emphasised the picturesque aspects of Edinburgh's urban landscape. John Thomson (1852–90) undertook a similar documentary study of London street life between 1876 and 1877.

Other important figures included Thomas Keith (1827–95), one of the first architectural photographers. George Washington Wilson (1823–93) pioneered instant photography and landscape photography, becoming "photographer to the Queen" and his Aberdeen company was the largest producer of topographical prints by 1880. Clementina Hawarden (1822–65) produced posed portraits that were among the first in a tradition of female photography. In the 1850s amateur photographer Mary Jane Matherson took her camera outside to create compositions that can be described as genre art, including A Picnic in the Glen and An Angler at Rest.

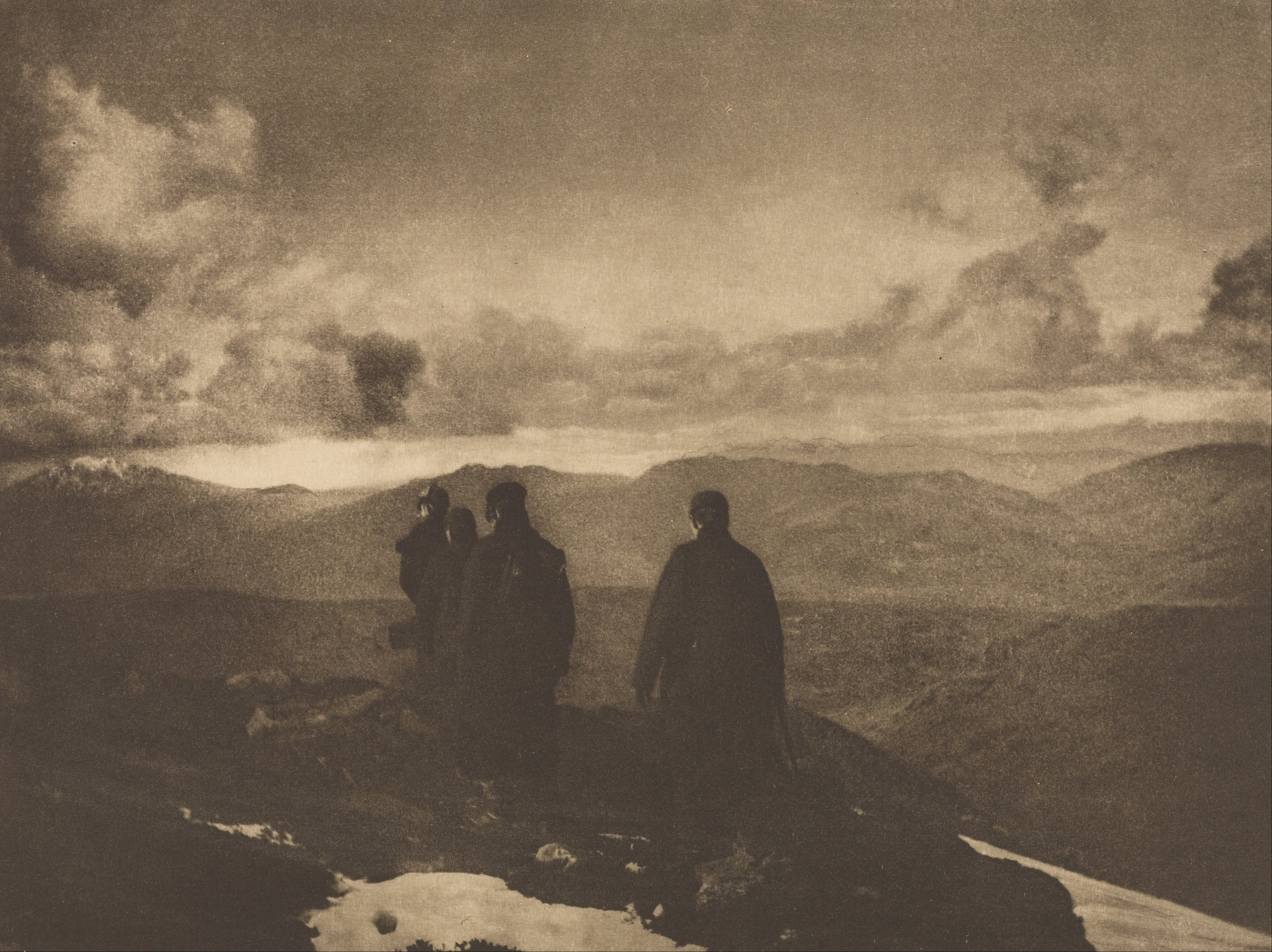
James Craig Annan's The Dark Mountains (1904), uses the photogravure process to create a simple contrasting image.

Documentary war photography was pioneered by Scottish surgeon James MacCosh (1805–85), who produced photographs of the Second Sikh War (1848–49) and the Second Burmese War (1852–53). Scottish photographer James Robertson (1813–88) worked in the Crimean War (1853–56), producing a record of the Siege of Sevastopol in 1855 and then being employed by the British army in India. The émigré Scot Alexander Gardner played a major role in photographing the American Civil War, taking iconic images of President Lincoln on the Battlefield of Antietam (1862) and Home of a Rebel Sharpshooter (1863). Other Scots that made their reputation as photographers abroad, often being the first to exploit the medium there, include William Carrick (1827–78) in Russia, William Notman (1826–91) and Alexander Henderson (1831–1913) in Canada, James MacDonald In Israel, John Thompson in Asia, Robert MacPherson (1811–72) in Italy and George Valentine (1852–90) in New Zealand.

Annan's son James Craig Annan (1864–1946) popularised the work of Hill & Adamson in the US and worked with American photographic advocate Alfred Stieglitz (1864–1946). Annan and Stieglitz pioneered the more stable photogravure process. The younger Annan also joined the Linked Ring, which broke away from the Royal Photographic Society in 1892 with a manifesto that saw photography as much as an art as a science and that it should be treated as the equal of conventional visual art. He championed the "artistic" framing and hanging of photographic exhibitions.

=== Twentieth century to the present ===
A number of Scots acted as photographers in the First World War (1914–18), including dispatch rider and ambulance driver Mairi Chisholm (1896–1981) who used a lightweight Vest Pocket Kodak camera, that allowed her to capture an image during a bombardment, in her Chishom and Knocker Under Fire at Pervyse (1917), which can be seen as the first "action shots" of war.

Having pioneered photography in the late nineteenth century, the artistic attainment of native photographers was not high in the early twentieth century. Notable photographic work in Scotland included that of visiting artists, such as Alvin Langdon Coburn (1882–1966), who produced illustrations for the work of Robert Louis Stevenson and Paul Strand (1890–1976), who produced atmospheric depictions of Hebridean landscapes. There was also the record of the Gorbals in Glasgow made by figures such as Bert Hardy (1913–95), Joseph MacKenzie (b. 1929) and Oscar Marzaroli (1933–88), and by Wolfgang Suschitzky (b. 1912) in Glasgow and Dundee.

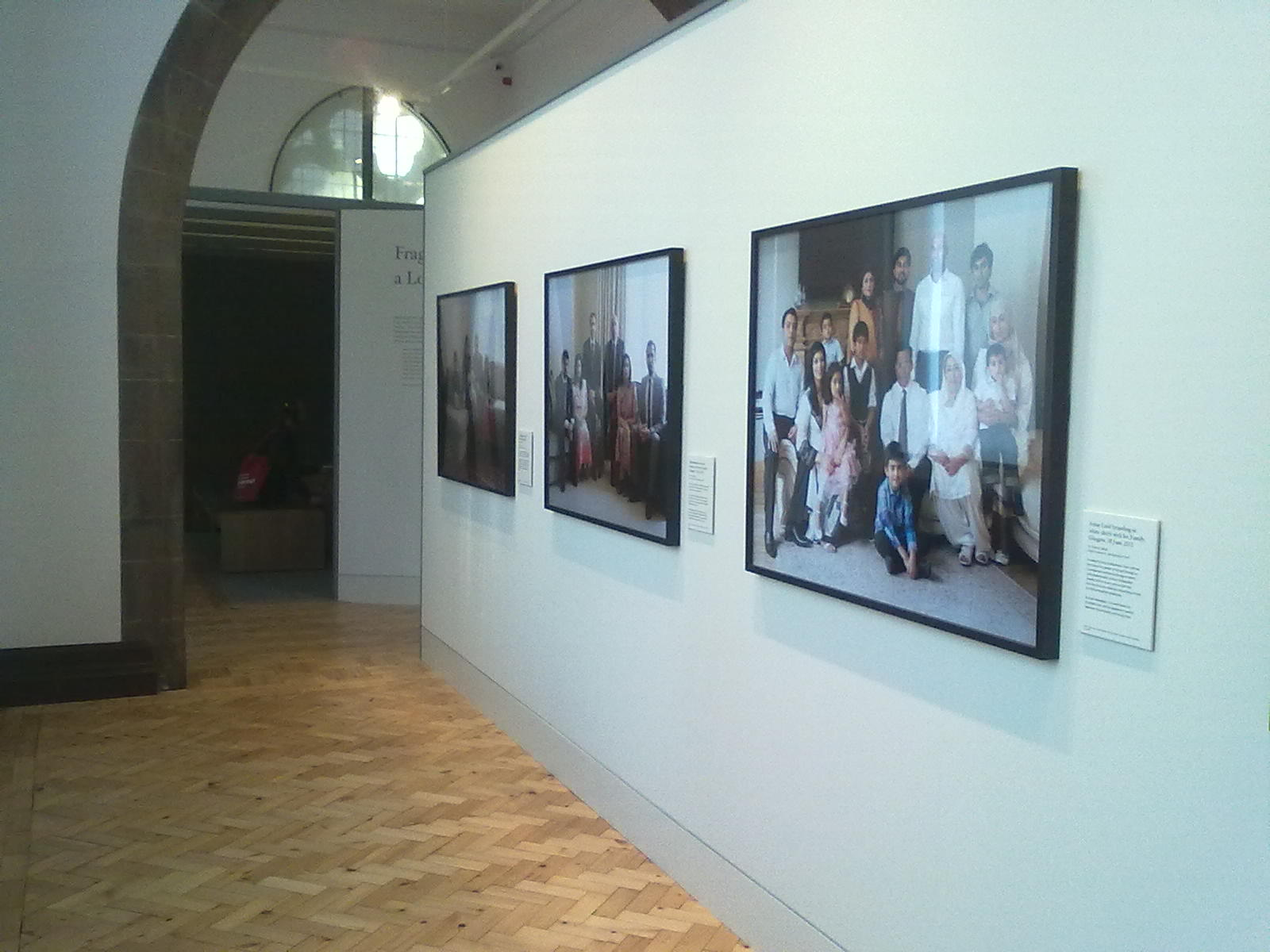
A standing display of photography on immigration at the Scottish National Portrait Gallery

In the late twentieth century, photography in Scotland enjoyed a renaissance, encouraged by figures including Richard Hough (1945–85), who founded the Stills Gallery for photography in Edinburgh in 1977, and Murray Johnston (1949–90), who was its director (1982–86). The 1986 Constructed Narratives exhibition at the Stills Gallery signalled the renaissance, showcasing the work of Calum Colvin (b. 1961) and Ron O'Donnell (b. 1952), both of whom produced intensely coloured and constructed photographic works. Important practitioners in Scotland included the American Thomas Joshua Cooper (b. 1946). More recent exponents who have received acclaim include Pradip Malde (b. 1957), Maud Sulter (1960–2008) and Owen Logan (b. 1963). The range of contemporary talent was showcased by the 1994 Light in the Dark Room exhibition in 1995.

== Galleries ==
Scotland lacks a national gallery of photography, but there are the dedicated Stills and Portfolio galleries in Edinburgh. There is also space dedicated to photography at the Scottish National Portrait Gallery and the Street Level Gallery in Glasgow. Traditional art galleries also increasingly accept exhibitions of photographic art.

== Education ==
Photography is taught at degree level in Scotland at Edinburgh College of Art, Napier University, Glasgow School of Art and Duncan of Jordanstone College of Art and Design within the University of Dundee, where there is a particular emphasis on cutting-edge technology. The history of photography is usually taught within the context of art history at institutions including St Andrews University. It is also taught at further education colleges throughout the country.
