= Ethnic minorities in Scotland =

Ethnic demography of Scotland 1981–2011

In the 2011 Scottish census conducted by the Scottish Government, Scotland's population was recorded to be 96% White, a 2% decrease from the previous census held in 2001. 91.8% of Scotland's population claimed to be White Scottish or White: Other British, whilst 4.2% were recorded as Polish, Irish, Gypsy/Traveller or ‘White: Other’. The recorded population of Asian, African, Caribbean or Black, Mixed or Other ethnic groups doubled to 4% in the 2011 census.

The highest proportion of those claimed to belong to an ethnic minority group were in the two largest cities in Scotland – Edinburgh and Glasgow – at 17.9% and 17.3% respectively.

== 2011 census ==
=== White ethnic minorities ===
At the 2011 census in Scotland, a total of 221,000 people were recorded to have claimed to belong to a white ethnic minority group. The most frequently claimed white ethnic minority groups were as follows:

- 61,000 people who identified themselves as 'White: Polish'
- 54,000 people who identified themselves as 'White: Irish'
- 29,000 people who identified themselves as 'White: Other Western European'
- 4,000 people in Scotland identified themselves as 'White: Gypsy/Traveller'

=== Asian ethnicities ===
Between 2001 and 2011, Scotland's Asian population had almost doubled, rising by 69,000 people. 2.7%, or roughly 141,000 of Scotland's population, were recorded as Asian in the 2011 census. This was between:

- 50,000 people who identified themselves as 'Pakistani'
- 34,000 people who identified themselves as 'Chinese'
- 33,000 people who identified themselves as 'Indian'
- 21,000 people who identified themselves as 'Other'
- 4,000 people who identified themselves as 'Bangladeshi'

=== African, Caribbean or Black ethnicities ===
In 2011, African, Caribbean or Black ethnicities made up roughly 0.7% of Scotland's recorded population. By 2011, the population of African, Caribbean or Black ethnicities had increased by 28,000 people. Roughly, 30,000 people identified themselves as 'African', and just under 7,000 people identified themselves as 'Caribbean or Black' in the 2011 Scottish census.

=== Mixed or other ethnic groups ===
Approximately, just under 1% of the recorded population in Scotland in 2011 identified themselves as mixed or another ethnic group. Roughly, this amounted to 34,000 people, with:

- 20,000 people who identified themselves as 'Mixed or Multiple ethnic groups'
- 9,000 people who identified themselves as 'Other: Arab'
- 5,000 people who identified themselves as 'Other: Other ethnicity'

== Diversity across Scotland ==
On average, Scotland's cities populations had the highest proportion of ethnic minorities. In Edinburgh, 17.9% identified themselves as an ethnic minority, whereas in Glasgow, the recorded figure was 17.3%. In other cities, Aberdeen recorded 17.1% and Dundee 10.6% of the population.

== Background and historical data ==
The 1991, 2001 and 2011 censuses recorded the following ethnic groups:

Demography of Scotland
Ethnic group	1981 estimations		1991		2001		2011	
Ethnic group	Number	%	Number	%	Number	%	Number	%
White: Total	4,908,140	99.1%	4,935,933	98.74%	4,960,334	97.99%	5,084,407	96.02%
White: Scottish	–	–	–	–	4,459,071	88.09%	4,445,678	83.95%
White: Other British	–	–	–	–	373,685	7.38%	417,109	7.88%
White: Irish	–	–	–	–	49,428	0.98%	54,090	1.02%
White: Gypsy/Traveller (Note: New category created for the 2011 census)	–	–	–	–	–	–	4,212	0.08%
White: Polish	–	–	–	–	–	–	61,201	1.16%
White: Other	–	–	–	–	78,150	1.54%	102,117	1.93%
Asian, Asian Scottish or Asian British: Total	–	–	42,852	0.86%	71,317	1.41%	140,678	2.66%
Asian, Asian Scottish or Asian British: Indian	–	–	10,050	0.20%	15,037	0.30%	32,706	0.62%
Asian, Asian Scottish or Asian British: Pakistani	–	–	21,192	0.42%	31,793	0.63%	49,381	0.93%
Asian, Asian Scottish or Asian British: Bangladeshi	–	–	1,134	0.02%	1,981	0.04%	3,788	0.07%
Asian, Asian Scottish or Asian British: Chinese	–	–	10,476	0.21%	16,310	0.32%	33,706	0.64%
Asian, Asian Scottish or Asian British: Asian Other	–	–	4,604	0.09%	6,196	0.12%	21,097	0.40%
Black, Black Scottish or Black British (Note: Category restructured for the 2011 census)	–	–	3,707	0.07%	6,247	0.12%	–	–
African: Total	–	–	–	–	–	–	29,638	0.56%
African: African, African Scottish or African British	–	–	–	–	–	–	29,186	0.55%
African: Other African	–	–	–	–	–	–	452	0.01%
Caribbean or Black: Total	–	–	–	–	–	–	6,540	0.12%
Caribbean	–	–	–	–	–	–	3,430	0.06%
Black	–	–	–	–	–	–	2,380	0.04%
Caribbean or Black: Other	–	–	–	–	–	–	730	0.01%
Mixed or multiple ethnic groups: Total	–	–	–	–	12,764	0.25%	19,815	0.37%
Other: Total	–	–	8,825	0.18%	9,571	0.19%	14,325	0.27%
Other: Arab	–	–	–	–	–	–	9,366	0.18%
Other: Any other ethnic group	–	–	–	–	9,571	0.19%	4,959	0.09%
Ethnic minority: Total	46,188	0.9%	55,384	1.1%	106,146	2%	210,996	4%
Total:	4,954,328	100%	4,998,567	100.00%	5,062,011	100.00%	5,295,403	100.00%

=== Ethnicity of school pupils ===
Ethnic group	School year									
Ethnic group	2004		2008		2012		2016		2021	
Ethnic group	Population	%	Population	%	Population	%	Population	%	Population	%
White: Total	671,029	92.7%	633,230	92.9%	622,722	92.8%	624,363	91.3%	624,821	88.7%
White: Scottish	663,007	91.7%	618,829	90.8%	579,136	86.3%	555,476	81.1%	537,004	76.2%
White: Other British	663,007	91.7%	618,829	90.8%	21,163	3.1%	34,580	5%	44,842	6.4%
White: Irish	–	–	–	–	–	–	–	–	1,499	0.2%
White: Polish	–	–	–	–	–	–	–	–	16,790	2.4%
White: Traveller/Gypsy	–	–	–	–	864		1,121		1,435	0.2%
White: Other	8,022		14,401		21,559		33,186		23,251	3.3%
Asian or Asian British: Total	15,053	2.1%	18,213	2.7%	21,955	3.3%	26,660	3.9%	33,161	4.8%
Asian or Asian British: Indian	2,163		2,825		3,930		5,378		7,442	1.1%
Asian or Asian British: Pakistani	8,683		9,850		11,430		12,980		14,771	2.1%
Asian or Asian British: Bangladeshi	473		541		714		908		1,359	0.2%
Asian or Asian British: Chinese	2,202		2,248		2,637		3,707		4,922	0.7%
Asian or Asian British: Asian Other	1,532		2,749		3,244		3,687		4,667	0.7%
African: Total	1,529	0.2%	2,815	0.4%	4,257	0.6%	6,555	0.9%	10,295	1.4%
African: African, African Scottish or African British	–	–	–	–	–	–	–	–	6,556	0.9%
African: Other African	–	–	–	–	–	–	–	–	3,739	0.5%
Caribbean or Black: Total	595	–	586	–	708	0.1%	1,033	0.1%	1,429	0.2%
Caribbean/Black: Scottish	105		126		–	–	–	–	930	0.1%
Caribbean or Black: Other	490		460		–	–	–	–	499	0.1%
Mixed: Total	4,814	0.6%	6,146	0.9%	6,956	1%	8,408	1.2%	11,533	1.6%
Other: Total	2,500	0.3%	3,005	0.4%	3,034	0.4%	5,250	0.7%	8,608	1.2
Other: Any other ethnic group	–	–	–	–	2,346		3,118		4,523	0.6%
Other: Arab	–	–	–	–	688		2,132		4,085	0.6%
Unknown or not stated	27,074	3.7%	16,467	2.4%	11,330	1.7%	11,939	1.7%	14,876	2.1%
Total:	723,175	100%	681,277	100%	670,962	100%	684,208	100%	704,723	100%

== See also ==
- Demographics of Scotland
