= List of biosphere reserves in Scotland =

There are currently two biosphere reserves in Scotland, a non-statutory designation issued by the United Nations Educational, Scientific and Cultural Organization (UNESCO) from its Man and the Biosphere Programme (1971).

== Current reserves ==
As of February 2024, Scotland has two designated biosphere reserves:

- Wester Ross Biosphere Reserve, formerly known as Beinn Eighe
- Galloway and Southern Ayrshire Biosphere Reserve

In 2016, the Wester Ross Biosphere Reserve was extended, with the Galloway and Southern Biosphere Reserve being extended in 2012 by the United Nations Educational, Scientific and Cultural Organization (UNESCO). Both sites were extended in order to address the changes in criteria for biosphere reserves as well as the purpose of sites being designated as a biosphere reserve.

=== Wester Ross ===
Situated in the northwest of Scotland, the reserve is noted for its "suite of habitats primarily influenced by upland and oceanic factors". Much of the reserve is covered by open heathland, bare rock, scree as well as wet grassland which includes scattered bogs and peat lands. Of particular interest in preserving is the presence of two variants of dwarf shrub heath and a western variant of moss heath. The reserve includes the best remaining examples of western pinewood in Britain. It was designated a biosphere reserve by UNESCO in 1976.

=== Galloway and Southern Ayrshire ===
The Galloway and Southern Ayrshire Biosphere Reserve comprises a large bio-geographic region which is represented by the presence of upland massif which is located centrally on the Merrick, with rivers which flow from its upland down the forests and farmland to the sea. The landscape of the area consists largely of uplands, moorlands, mires, woodlands and forests, farmland, river valleys, coast and shoreline. UNESCO recognises the importance of the reserve in "demonstrating the importance of landscapes and ecosystems for the future of sustainable development in a region which is undergoing change in traditional livelihoods". It was designated a biosphere reserve by UNESCO in 2012.

== Selection process ==
In Scotland, any community or organisation can propose for a site to be designated a biosphere reserve location. Proposed sites are put to UNESCO for consideration by either the Scottish Government or HM Government. Each biosphere reserve site listed by UNESCO is reviewed every five years. If a site is successful is becoming a bisosphere reserve site, then the community in which the site is located is ultimately responsible for its maintenance and preserving its status as a biosphere reserve.

== Protection and management ==
The Scottish Government recognised that site with an active biosphere reserve designation greatly enhances the promotion of integrated and sustainable management of the area. To achieve this, the Scottish Government advocates that two main principles must be applied:

- "the use of a zonation approach with a protected core area and a buffer area within which sustainable development may be promoted"
- "participation of the local community"

== See also ==
- Geography of Scotland
