= Pressure groups in Scotland =

Pressure groups in Scotland serve as a means of influence by the public and individuals who share the same view on various different issues, and aim to influence and change Scottish Government policy, legislation and conduct. Pressure groups influence government policy and decision making by organising and participating in marches and rally events, creating petitions, "lobbying" members of the Scottish Parliament (MSPs), writing to politicians and newspapers, as well as engaging with other forms of media such as television and radio broadcasts, and aiming to increase publicity by engaging in publicity stunts, the majority of which are legal and peaceful, however, some can be disruptive and unlawful.

== Types of pressure groups ==
=== Insider groups ===
Insider pressure groups are groups which have the support of the Scottish Government. The government will frequently engage with insider pressure groups for advice on a range of issues relevant to their cause, as well as to discuss either new laws, or amendments to existing Scots law.

The Educational Institute of Scotland is a prominent insider pressure group, and as such, rely heavily on mutual engagements and discussions with the government rather than organising marches and rallies.

=== Outsider groups ===
The opposite of insider pressure groups, outsider pressure groups are groups who do not directly engage with the government, or have any real influence over government policy and decision making. Most often, their views and actions do not always have the support of the government, as well as often disapproving of their actions. In order to gain the attention of the government and secure discussions to influence policy, outsider pressure groups rely on high-profile media campaigns and stunts in order to get their cause recognised by the government.

Outsider pressure groups, such as Greenpeace and Friends of the Earth, have held demonstrations and rallies in recent years against fracking in Scotland and the wider United Kingdom.

== Actions and means ==
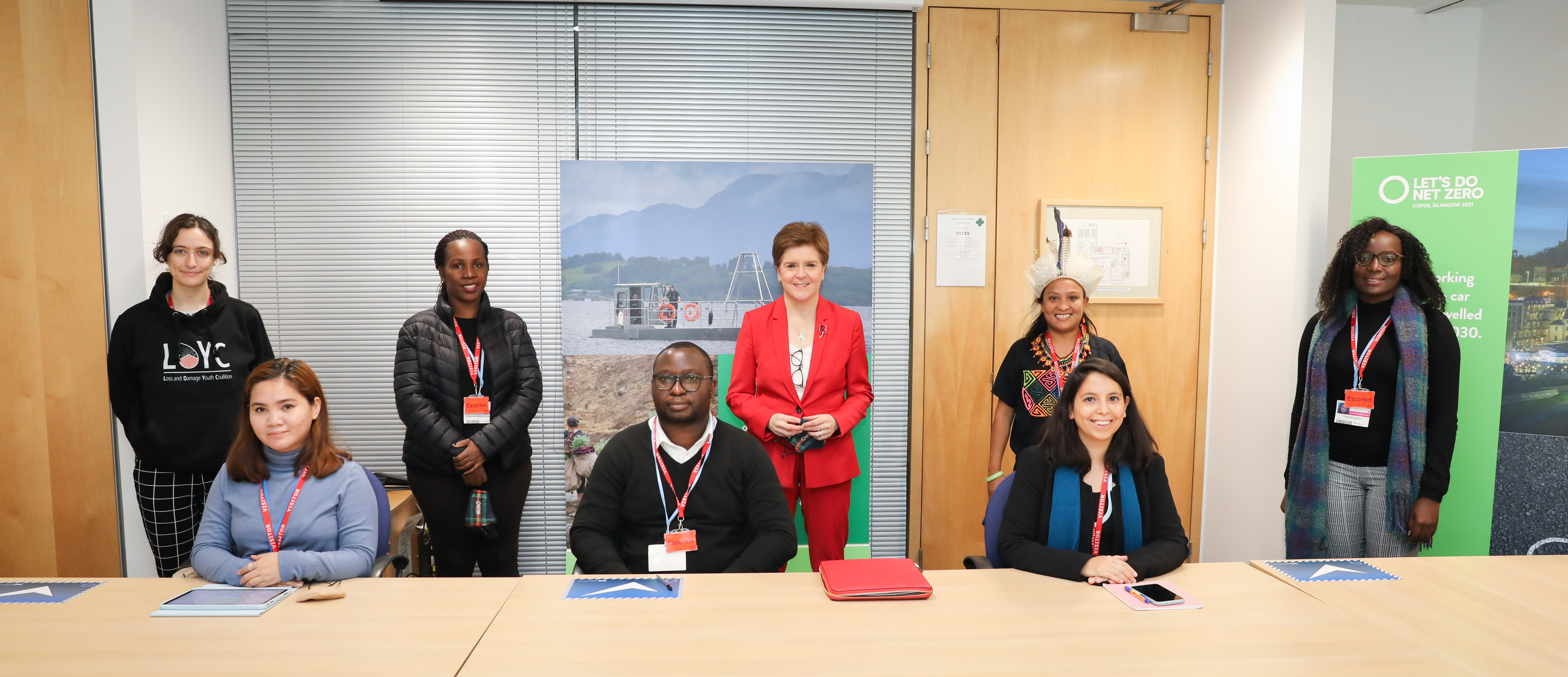
First Minister Nicola Sturgeon with members of the pressure group Stop Climate Chaos Scotland

Individuals join a pressure group in order to voice their support for a particular issue, allowing them to collaborate with other individuals who share a similar view in order to influence Scotland's various systems of government – the Scottish Government, local government, community councils, and the UK Government.

Some examples of pressure groups which have operated in Scotland in the past include:

- Average Speed cameras on the A9 are not the Answer – a local pressure group
- Friends of the Earth Scotland are a national pressure group
- Amnesty International is a large international pressure group

It is commonly accepted amongst pressure groups operating in Scotland that they have the right to criticise the government and politicians, protest as long as they are lawful, informing Police Scotland and the local council of where and when demonstrations are expected to occur, information distributed by pressure groups are based on facts, and avoid intimidating politicians or the public as part of their cause. It is the responsibility of pressure groups to organise and hold meetings of their group with other members to discuss agenda and target setting and to represent the views of all members in their entirety. Pressure groups have the right to use the national media to gain attention and share their views as relevant to their cause. In Scotland, media sources such as BBC Scotland, STV, Daily Record, The Scotsman, The National and BBC Radio Scotland, amongst others, can all be used by pressure groups to broadcast and share the message of their cause.

== Examples of groups in Scotland ==
- Out for Independence (the Scottish National Party's LGBT wing)
- Rainbow Greens (the Scottish Greens LGBT wing)
- For Women Scotland
- Friends of the Earth Scotland
- Greenpeace
- Fathers 4 Justice
- Campaign for Nuclear Disarmament
  - Scottish Campaign for Nuclear Disarmament
- Celtic League
- It's Scotland's oil
- Business for Scotland
- Campaign for a Scottish Olympic Team
- Ceartas
- Clì Gàidhlig
- Democratic Left Scotland
- Equality Network
- Exit (right-to-die organisation)
- Labour for Independence
- N-56
- Scotland Against Criminalising Communities
- Scottish Constitutional Convention
- Scottish League for the Taxation of Land Values
- Scottish Palestine Solidarity Campaign
- Scottish Wildlife Trust
- Siol nan Gaidheal
- SNP Trade Union Group
- Stop Climate Chaos Scotland

== See also ==
- Politics of Scotland
  - Scottish Government
  - Scottish Parliament
- Pressure groups in the United Kingdom
- Democracy
