= Prison population of Scotland =

In 2021–2022, the Prison population of Scotland was recorded at just over 7,500 inmates by the Scottish Government. The prison population in the country was reported to be expected to increase in 2023–2024, after a decline during the COVID-19 pandemic in Scotland. Whilst the Scottish Government did not confirm or deny whether the projection which was claimed by the BBC was accurate, they did claim that they were continuing with work in order to decrease the prison population.

== Overview ==
The recorded prison population in Scotland between 2021 and 2022 was a 1% increase from the recorded number of inmates in 2020–2021. The Scottish Government highlighted in November 2022 when the data for 2021–2022 was released that the balance between the balance of those sentenced and the remand populations in Scotland's prisons continued to shift.

On average, the daily remand population in prisons across the country increased by 14% approximately, with 1,862 by November 2022, in contrast to 1,634 in the previous year. The Scottish Government claimed that is due to a higher number of individuals being held on remand than in previous recorded years. Between 2021 and 2022, Scotland's prisons recorded their highest ever number of individuals on remand.

The average daily growth in the remand population between 2020–21 and 2021-22 was present in only three of the index of alleged offences groups;

- Group 1: (Violence) +9% to 989
- Group 2: (Sexual crimes) +23% to 209
- Group 5: (Crimes against society) +34% to 386

Approximately, 60% of the average daily remand population in Scotland's prisons throughout 2021-22 were accused of index Group 1 (Violence) and 2 (Sexual crimes) offences. Additionally, further 21% of individuals were accused of crimes in Group 5 (Crimes against society).

The average time for individuals in prison on remand had increased by November 2022. The time individuals spent between remand to receiving a sentence had also increased, with the average number of days for individuals to wait on a sentence being 57 days in 2021–2022. In previous recorded years, individuals waited on average 55 days in 2020–2021 and 36 days in 2019–2020.

== Issues and limitations ==
In February 2024, the Chief Executive of the Scottish Prison Service claimed that Scotland's prisons were at "breaking point", further claiming that the prison estate in Scotland "cannot take anymore [inmates]". Addressing such concerns, the Scottish Prison Service said that in order to cope with the increase in population in prisons, "drastic measures" may be required to be implemented by March 2024. Addressing the concerns raised by the Scottish Prison Service, the Cabinet Secretary for Justice and Home Affairs Angela Constance said that "ministers were looking at contingency measures and investing in community sentences to try to reduce the prison population". She further claimed that "I would very much accept that as a consequence of a rising prison population, that that has an impact on progression, it has an impact on rehabilitation. And that is why addressing a rising prison population is also a matter of community safety".

The comments made by the Chief Executive of the Scottish Prison Service has led to concerns being raised regarding the early release of inmates as a measure to cope with the increased demand and increase in the prison population.

== See also ==
- Scottish Prison Service (SPS)
- Scots law
- Scottish Government
- Cabinet Secretary for Justice and Home Affairs
- List of courts in Scotland
