= 1891 Census of Scotland =

The 1891 Census of Scotland was implemented on 5 April 1891. The following information was requested for each residence:

- Place (name of street, place, parish, roadway and name or number of house).
- For each person who had spent the night in the residence:
  - Name
  - Relationship to the head of household.
  - Marital status
  - Age and sex (indicated in the same column)
  - Occupation or profession
  - Whether an employer, an employee or self employed
  - Birthplace
  - Whether Gaelic or either Gaelic and or English is spoken.
  - Whether blind, dumb, deaf, imbecile, idiot or lunatic.
- The number of rooms within the dwelling that have one or more windows.

The population in Scotland on 5 April 1891 was 4,033,103 people.
