= Etymology of Scotland =

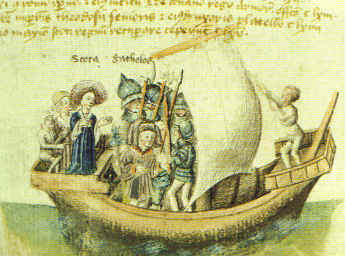
The mythology of Scota in late medieval legend, Scota with Goídel Glas, voyaging from Egypt, as depicted in a 15th-century manuscript of the Scotichronicon of Walter Bower.

Scotland (Scottish Gaelic: Alba [ˈal̪ˠapə]) is a country that occupies the northern third of the island of Great Britain and forms part of the United Kingdom. The name of Scotland is derived from the Latin Scoti, the term applied to Gaels. The origin of the word Scotia dates back to the 4th century and was first used by Roman writers to describe the northern Gaelic group of raiders that left present-day Ireland and landed in west coast Scotland.

== Overview ==
The word "Scot" is found in Latin texts from the fourth century describing a tribe which sailed from Ireland to raid Roman Britain. It came to be applied to all the Gaels. It is not believed that any Gaelic groups called themselves Scoti in ancient times, except when writing in Latin. Charles Oman derives it from Scuit, proposing a meaning of 'a man cut off', suggesting that a Scuit was not a Gael as such but one of a renegade band settled in the part of Ulster which became the kingdom of Dál Riata. The 19th century author Aonghas MacCoinnich of Glasgow proposed that Scoti was derived from a Gaelic ethnonym (proposed by MacCoinnich) Sgaothaich from sgaoth "swarm", plus the derivational suffix -ach (plural -aich) However, this proposal to date has not appeared in mainstream place-name studies.

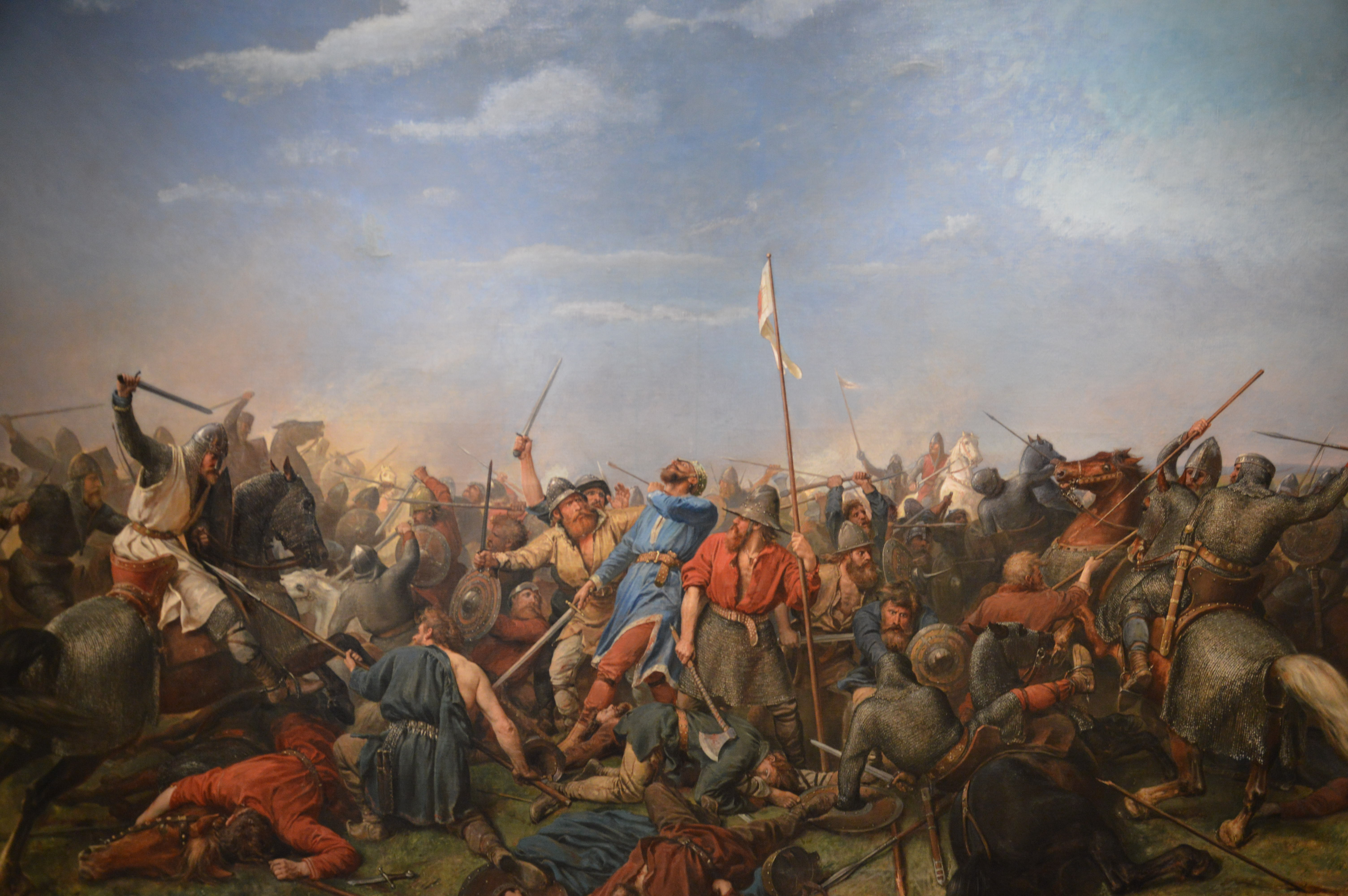
Battle of Stamford Bridge, by Peter Nicolai Arbo

The Late Latin word Scotia (land of the Scot(t)i), although initially used to refer to Ireland, by the 11th century at the latest the name Scotland was being used by English writers to refer to the (Gaelic-speaking) Kingdom of Alba north of the river Forth. Some of the earliest surviving documents to mention the word Scotland include versions of the Anglo-Saxon Chronicle from Abingdon, Worcester and Laud, written during the 11th Century, which state that prior to the Battle of Stamford Bridge in 1066, Earl Tostig had sought refuge in Scotland under the protection of Malcolm III, King of Scots. 'Scotland' was employed alongside Albania or Albany, from the Gaelic Alba. The use of the words Scots and Scotland to encompass all of what is now Scotland became common only in the Late Middle Ages.

In a modern political context, the word Scot is applied equally to all inhabitants of Scotland, regardless of their ancestral ethnicity. However, a 2006 study published by the University of Edinburgh suggest that segments of Scottish society continue to distinguish between those who claim to be Scots on ethnic grounds and those who claim to be Scots on the grounds of civic commitment. "Scots" is also used to refer to the Scots language, which a large proportion of the Scottish population speak to a greater or lesser degree.

The Scots Gaelic name for Scotland, Alba, derives from the same Celtic root as the name Albion, which properly designates the entire island of Great Britain but, by implication as used by foreigners, sometimes the country of England, Scotland's southern neighbour which covers the largest portion of the island of Britain. The term arguably derives from an early Indo-European word meaning 'white', generally held to refer to the cliffs of white chalk around the English town of Dover, ironically located at the furthest end of Great Britain from Scotland itself. Others take it to come from the same root as "the Alps", possibly being an ancient word for mountain and therefore related to the northern part of Britain.

Flag of Scotland, 1542 to Current

Caledonia is an old Latin name for Scotland, deriving from the Caledonii tribe. It is unknown what name the Caledonians used of themselves, although it was possibly based on a Brythonic word for "hard" or "tough" (represented by the modern Welsh caled).

== See also ==
- Origins of the Kingdom of Alba
