= Environment of Scotland =

Scotland is located in north-western Europe, and is a country of the United Kingdom.

Scotland occupies the northern part of the British Isles. The landscape of the country is diverse; ranging from rugged mountain terrain to arable flat land with many rivers and lochs.

== Biota ==
The flora of Scotland is typical of the northern European part of the Palearctic realm. Prominent among Scotland's sub-biomes are the boreal Caledonian Forest, heather moorland and coastal machairs. This Caledonian Forest once covered almost all of Scotland but now only approximately 1% of the forest remains across 84 individual sites.

Scotland's environment supports 62 species of wild mammals, including Scottish wildcats, grey and harbour seals and the most northerly colony of bottlenose dolphins. The black and red grouse populate Scotland's moorland and the country has significant nesting grounds for seabirds. The Scottish crossbill is the only endemic vertebrate species in the UK. Scotland's seas are among the most biologically productive in the world with at least 40,000 species are estimated to live in Scottish waters. 14,000 species of insect inhabit Scotland, including rare species. The population of large mammals rapidly decreased to extinction in historic times.

== Climate ==
The climate of Scotland is classified as temperate and tends to be very changeable. Warm air from the Gulf Stream makes Scotland's climate much warmer than other areas on similar latitudes. For example, in Labrador, Canada the sea freezes over in winter and icebergs are a common feature in spring and early summer or Fort McMurray, Canada where -35 °C is not uncommon during winter.

As Scotland occupies the cooler northern section of Great Britain, temperatures are generally lower than the rest of the United Kingdom. The average maximum temperatures in Scotland are 5.0-5.7 °C in winter and 20-25 °C in summer. The coldest ever UK temperature of -27.2 °C was recorded at Braemar in the Grampian Mountains on 10 January 1982 and at Altnaharra, Highlands on 30 December 1985. The hottest temperature ever recorded in Scotland of 32.9 °C was recorded at Greycrook, Scottish Borders on 9 August 2003.

Rainfall varies widely throughout Scotland. The western highlands of Scotland are one of the wettest places in Europe with annual rainfall up to 4577mm. This type of precipitation is orographic in nature. Wet, warm is forced to rise on contact with the mountainous coast, where it cools and condenses forming clouds. Much of eastern Scotland receives less than 870mm annually in comparison. Snowfall is less common in lowland areas but becomes increasingly more common with altitude.

== Geography ==
Scotland is located in north-west Europe and comprises the northern third of the island of Great Britain. Scotland is surrounded by 790 islands incorporating the major archipelagos of the Shetland Islands, the Orkney Islands and the Outer Hebrides.

Scotland's only land border is with England. It runs 96 kilometres (60 miles) in a north-easterly direction from the Solway Firth in the west to the North Sea on the east coast. The island of Ireland lies 30 kilometres (19 miles) from the south-west tip of the Scottish mainland. Norway is located 305 kilometres (190 miles) to the north-east of Scotland across the North Sea.

== Land ==
The total area of Scotland is 78,772 km^{2} (30,414 sq mi). Scotland has 11,800 kilometres (7,300 miles) of coastline.

There are three main geographical sub-divisions in Scotland separated by two boundary fault lines. The Highlands and Islands (commonly abbreviated to the Highlands) lies to the north and west of the Highland Boundary Fault. The Central Lowlands and the Southern Uplands lie to the south of this fault line. The Southern Uplands Fault separates these two geographical areas.

The Highlands, which make up about 60% of Scotland, are extensive mountainous areas rising to peaks of about 1,300 metres (4,300 feet). By international standards, Scotland's mountains are not high, but their exposure to changeable and very unpredictable weather influenced by the meeting of European and Atlantic air streams gives them seriousness that is out of proportion with their height. The Grampian Mountains is a mountain range that is to the east of the Great Glen. The mountains are characterised by their large areas of upland plateau. The city of Aberdeen and the nearby surrounding area is more like the Central Lowlands as their fertile plains are not similar to the rest of the highlands.

The Central Lowlands make up 20% of Scotland and include the Forth-Clyde Canal. The area became home of widespread industrialisation from the late 18th century onwards. This was based on the large reserves of coal and iron ore found in the Central Lowlands, which was supported by the development of canals and railways.

The remaining 20% of Scotland is made up of the Southern Uplands, a pastoral upland area characterised by lines of hills divided by broad valleys. In addition to the main upland zones, there are individual hills that are not part of any ranges. Several of these hills are volcanic in origin and are known by the Scots word law. Examples of these include the North Berwick Law and the Traprain Law.

The west coast of Scotland, in particular, is heavily indented and is scattered with fjord-like sea lochs. The east coast is more regular with series of large estuarine inlets, or firths, and long sandy beaches. Much of Scottish coastline consists of machairs, a dune pasture land formed as sea levels subsided.

== Water ==
Scotland is bordered to the east by the North Sea and to the north and west by the Atlantic Ocean. Scotland has many rivers, lochs, reservoirs and estuaries. The River Tay is Scotland's longest river and is 193 kilometres (120 miles) long. Lakes in Scotland are known as lochs, with the exception of the Lake of Menteith and a few man-made lakes. The largest loch is Loch Lomond, which is 71.1 km^{2} (27.5 sq mi) in area and is Britain's largest freshwater body.

In Scotland, water is a plentiful resource. Scotland's numerous lochs and rivers provide all of Scotland's water needs. Like most countries, tap water is treated with chlorine to make it safe to drink. Unlike other countries, tap water charges are included in council tax.

== Climate change ==
Climate change poses a major threat to Scotland. Tackling climate change in Scotland is a devolved issue for the Scottish government, separate from the UK government. In 2009, the Scottish Parliament passed the Climate Change (Scotland) Act 2009. The act includes the framework for the reduction of greenhouse gas emissions and other duties for government ministers.

Climate change has already affected Scotland. Over fifty years, the frequency of winter storms has doubled. The UK has seen nine of the ten warmest summers since 1990. Sea levels in Scotland have risen by 10 cm since 1900.

== Environmental protection ==
Site-specific nature conservation began in the UK with the creation of the Nature Conservancy in 1948, which later became the Nature Conservancy Council (NCC). It moved from a research-based advisory group to become a campaigning body. The 1949 National Parks and Access to the Countryside Act excluded Scotland, but introduced the concept of Sites of Special Scientific Interest (SSSI), which were to become a key part of managing nature conservation. A Countryside Commission Scotland (CSS) was established under the Countryside (Scotland) Act 1967. The SSSI were strengthened by the Wildlife and Countryside Act 1981, which for the first time introduced the concept of payments to farmers for inactivity in relation to specific sites and shifted the burden of proof from conservationists having to prove harm, to landholders having to prove that harm was not taking place. The NCC was broken up in 1991 and in Scotland was merged with CSS to produce Scottish Natural Heritage (SNH), under a UK-wide Joint Nature Conservation Committee. SNH has a remit for both land and nature conservation and a responsibility towards sustainability and to the consideration of the needs of the Scottish people.

The Scottish Environment Protection Agency was established by the Environment Act 1995, and took over the functions in Scotland of the river purification boards, waste regulation authorities and the Industrial Pollution Inspectorate. Its responsibilities include the water environment, air pollution, waste regulation, industrial pollution, radioactive substances and flood risk management.

The Natural Environment (Scotland) Act 2026 received royal assent on 12 March 2026. Its primary aim is "to create a legally binding framework for setting statutory targets for nature restoration" in Scotland. The act empowers National Park authorities to restore and regenerate biodiversity within their boundaries.

== See also ==
- List of environmental issues
