= List of 21st-century writers =

This is a partial list of 21st-century writers. This list includes notable authors, poets, playwrights, philosophers, artists, scientists and other important and noteworthy contributors to literature. Literature (from Latin litterae (plural); letters) is the art of written works. Literally translated, the word literature means "acquaintance with letters" (as in the "arts and letters"). The two most basic written literary categories include fiction and non fiction.

== A ==
- Silvia Agüero
- Monica Ali
- James Altucher
- Núria Añó
- Nadeem Aslam
- Martin Amis
- Kurt Andersen
- Steve Anderson
- K. A. Applegate
- Jeffrey Archer
- Diana Athill
- Paul Auster
- Wasi Ahmed
- Ashley Audrain
- Victoria Aveyard
- Arundhati Roy

== B ==
- C. Morgan Babst
- Kevin Baker
- Nicholson Baker
- Iain Banks
- Russell Banks
- Julian Barnes
- Andrea Barrett
- Max Barry
- Sebastian Barry
- Christian Bauman
- Louis Bayard
- Peter Behrens
- Elizabeth Berg
- Wendell Berry
- Maeve Binchy
- Dustin Lance Black
- Roberto Bolaño
- Roberto Gómez Bolaños
- S. J. Bolton
- William Boyd
- T. C. Boyle
- John Boyne
- Paula Brackston
- Adam Braver
- Libba Bray
- Alan Brennert
- André Brink
- Max Brooks
- Dan Brown
- Don Brown
- Christopher Buckley
- Frederick Buechner
- John Burdett
- James Lee Burke
- Augusten Burroughs
- A. S. Byatt

== C ==
- W. Bruce Cameron
- Jacqueline Carey
- Peter Carey
- Ron Carlson
- Stephen L. Carter
- Eleanor Catton
- Michael Chabon
- Diane Chamberlain
- Jung Chang
- Kate Christensen
- Dan Chaon
- Kelly Cherry
- Tracy Chevalier
- Noam Chomsky
- Tom Clancy
- Cassandra Clare
- Susanna Clarke
- Chris Cleave
- Ernest Cline
- Harlan Coben
- Paulo Coelho
- J. M. Coetzee
- Eoin Colfer
- Suzanne Collins
- Michael Connelly
- Pat Conroy
- Claire Cook
- Bernard Cornwell
- Douglas Coupland
- Michael Cox
- Jim Crace
- Michael Crichton
- Justin Cronin
- John Crowley
- Clive Cussler

== D ==
- Fred D'Aguiar
- Sandra Dallas
- Edwidge Danticat
- Kathryn Davis
- Richard Dawkins
- Jonathan Dee
- Frank Delaney
- Charles de Lint
- Tatiana de Rosnay
- Kiran Desai
- Dhanashree Deshpande-Ganatra
- Pete Dexter
- Anita Diamant
- Junot Díaz
- Chitra Banerjee Divakaruni
- E. L. Doctorow
- Harry Dodge
- Ivan Doig
- Stephen R. Donaldson
- Sara Donati
- Jennifer Donnelly
- Emma Donoghue
- Keith Donohue
- Roddy Doyle
- Margaret Drabble
- Dinesh D'Souza
- John Dufresne
- Sarah Dunant
- Helen Dunmore
- Mark Dunn
- James Dashner
- Elisabetta Dami

== E ==
- Helen Edmundson
- Jennifer Egan
- Dave Eggers
- Kristín Eiríksdóttir
- Tan Twan Eng
- Louise Erdrich
- Diana Evans
- Percival Everett

== F ==
- J. G. Farrell
- Sebastian Faulks
- Jasper Fforde
- Joy Fielding
- Timothy Findley
- Becca Fitzpatrick
- Richard Flanagan
- Martin Fletcher
- Michael Flynn
- Jonathan Safran Foer
- Ken Follett
- Richard Ford
- Aminatta Forna
- Karen Joy Fowler
- Ariana Franklin
- Tom Franklin
- Michael Frayn
- Kate Furnivall

== G ==
- Patricia Gaffney
- Neil Gaiman
- Aleksandra Gajewska
- Dumitru Găleșanu
- Nicole Galland
- Cristina García
- Jane Gardam
- Alex Garland
- Maggie Gee
- Lisa Genova
- Elizabeth George
- Elizabeth Gilbert
- Abelard Giza
- Malcolm Gladwell
- Julia Glass
- Jyoti Gogte
- Nora Gold
- Francisco Goldman
- Adam Gopnik
- Mary Gordon
- Al Gore
- Jennifer Greene
- John Green
- Lavinia Greenlaw
- Andrew Sean Greer
- Philippa Gregory
- John Grisham
- David Grossman
- Sara Gruen
- Kim Gruenenfelder
- Sandra Gulland
- Romesh Gunesekera
- Beth Gutcheon

== H ==
- Han Kang
- Peter Handke
- Seamus Heaney
- Christoph Hein
- Khaled Hosseini
- Siri Hustvedt

== I-J ==
- Greg Iles
- John Irving
- Kazuo Ishiguro
- Joshilyn Jackson
- Howard Jacobson
- Paulette Jiles
- Michael Johns
- Owen Jones
- Gabriel Josipovici
- Graham Joyce

== K ==
- Ken Kalfus
- Jeanne Kalogridis
- Nitasha Kaul
- Joseph Kanon
- Abdullah Khan
- Payal Kapadia
- Sharat Kumar
- Advaita Kala
- Madhur Kapila
- Stephen King
- Lily King
- Haven Kimmel
- Thomas Keneally
- James Kelman
- Susanna Kearsley
- Sophie Kinsella

== L ==
- Jhumpa Lahiri
- Wally Lamb
- Anne Lamott
- John Lanchester
- Stieg Larsson
- Mary Lawson
- Chang-rae Lee
- Don Lee
- Dennis Lehane
- Lawrence Lessig
- Jonathan Lethem
- Kathy Lette
- Steven Levitt
- Andrea Levy
- Alan Lightman
- Elinor Lipman
- Laura Lippman
- S. E. Lister
- Penelope Lively
- Margot Livesey
- Lois Lowry
- Dimitris Lyacos

== M ==
- Sarah J. Maas
- Keith Maillard
- Amit Majmudar
- Thomas Mallon
- David Malouf
- Hilary Mantel
- Jo-Ann Mapson
- Hubert Marcoux
- Javier Marías
- Juliet Marillier
- Yann Martel
- Charles Martin
- George R. R. Martin
- Valerie Martin
- Steve Martini
- Peter Matthiessen
- Simon Mawer
- Tucker Max
- Peter May
- Joyce Maynard
- James McBride
- Colum McCann
- Cormac McCarthy
- Jill McCorkle
- Alice McDermott
- Ian McEwan
- Dennis McFarland
- Jon McGregor
- Mameve Medwed
- James Meek
- Pauline Melville
- Dinaw Mengestu
- Claire Messud
- Marissa Meyer
- Philipp Meyer
- Stephenie Meyer
- China Miéville
- Lydia Millet
- Mark Mills
- Susan Minot
- David Mitchell
- Deborah Moggach
- Nadifa Mohamed
- Mary Alice Monroe
- Michael Moorcock
- Michael Moore
- Robert Morgan
- Laura Moriarty
- Liane Moriarty
- Michael Morpurgo
- Toni Morrison
- Kate Morton
- Andrew Motion
- Jojo Moyes
- Bharati Mukherjee
- Alice Munro
- Haruki Murakami

== N-O ==
- V. S. Naipaul
- Narayan Debnath
- Bhalchandra Nemade
- Antonya Nelson
- Audrey Niffenegger
- Howard Norman
- Craig Nova
- Sandra Novack
- Joyce Carol Oates
- Vanessa O'Brien
- Joseph O'Connor
- Tawni O'Dell
- Maggie O'Farrell
- Michael Ondaatje
- Mary Pope Osborne
- Julie Otsuka
- Helen Oyeyemi
- Ruth Ozeki

== P-Q ==
- Chuck Palahniuk
- Charles Palliser
- Orhan Pamuk
- Christopher Paolini
- Rashmi Parekh
- Ann Patchett
- James Patterson
- Laline Paull
- Nancy Pearl
- Iain Pears
- Louise Penny
- Stef Penney
- Tom Perrotta
- Jordan Peterson
- Per Petterson
- Arthur Phillips
- Jodi Picoult
- Padgett Powell
- Kevin Powers
- Richard Powers
- Terry Pratchett
- Philip Pullman
- Joe Queenan
- Anna Quindlen

== R ==
- Arius Raposas
- Ron Rash
- Yasmina Reza
- Anne Rice
- Christopher Rice
- Rick Riordan
- Francine Rivers
- Kim Stanley Robinson
- Marilynne Robinson
- Roxana Robinson
- Monique Roffey
- M. J. Rose
- Meg Rosoff
- Veronica Roth
- J. K. Rowling
- Norman Rush
- Salman Rushdie
- Mary Doria Russell
- Rachel Renée Russell

== S ==
- Shan Sa
- Louis Sachar
- C. J. Sansom
- Brandon Sanderson
- Sam Savage
- John Sayles
- Cathleen Schine
- John Searles
- W. G. Sebald
- Alice Sebold
- Nachman Seltzer
- Diane Setterfield
- Jeff Shaara
- Darren Shan
- Ben Sherwood
- Carol Shields
- Marci Shore
- Anita Shreve
- Daniel Silva
- Paullina Simons
- Karin Slaughter
- Ali Smith
- Seth Grahame-Smith
- Sarah Smith
- Wilbur Smith
- Zadie Smith
- Agnieszka Stelmaszyk
- Jane Stevenson
- Margo Taft Stever
- Harold Stewart
- James B. Stewart
- R. L. Stine
- Kathryn Stockett
- Sam Stone
- Satyajit Ray
- Sunil Gangopadhyay
- Sanjib Chattopadhyay
- Jennifer Storm

== T ==
- Ruben Talberg
- Amy Tan
- Donna Tartt
- Miriam Toews
- Colm Tóibín
- Zlatko Topčić
- Rose Tremain
- William Trevor
- Adriana Trigiani
- Scott Turow
- Anne Tyler

== U-W ==
- Jane Urquhart
- Martin Vargic
- Daniel Wallace
- David Foster Wallace
- Natasha Walter
- Jo Walton
- Marina Warner
- Rick Warren
- Jennifer Weiner
- Lauren Weisberger
- Fay Weldon
- Alex Wheatle
- Jacqueline Wilson
- Jeanette Winterson
- Meg Wolitzer

== X-Z ==
- William P. Young
- Carlos Ruiz Zafón

== See also ==
- 21st century in literature
- 21st century in poetry
- Fiction
- List of 20th-century writers
- List of authors of erotic works
- List of avant-garde artists
- List of crime writers
- List of fantasy authors
- List of horror fiction writers
- List of non-fiction writers
- List of playwrights
- List of science fiction authors
- Lists of writers
- List of writers from peoples indigenous to the Americas
- List of years in literature
- Modern Library 100 Best Novels
- Non-fiction
