= History of universities in Scotland =

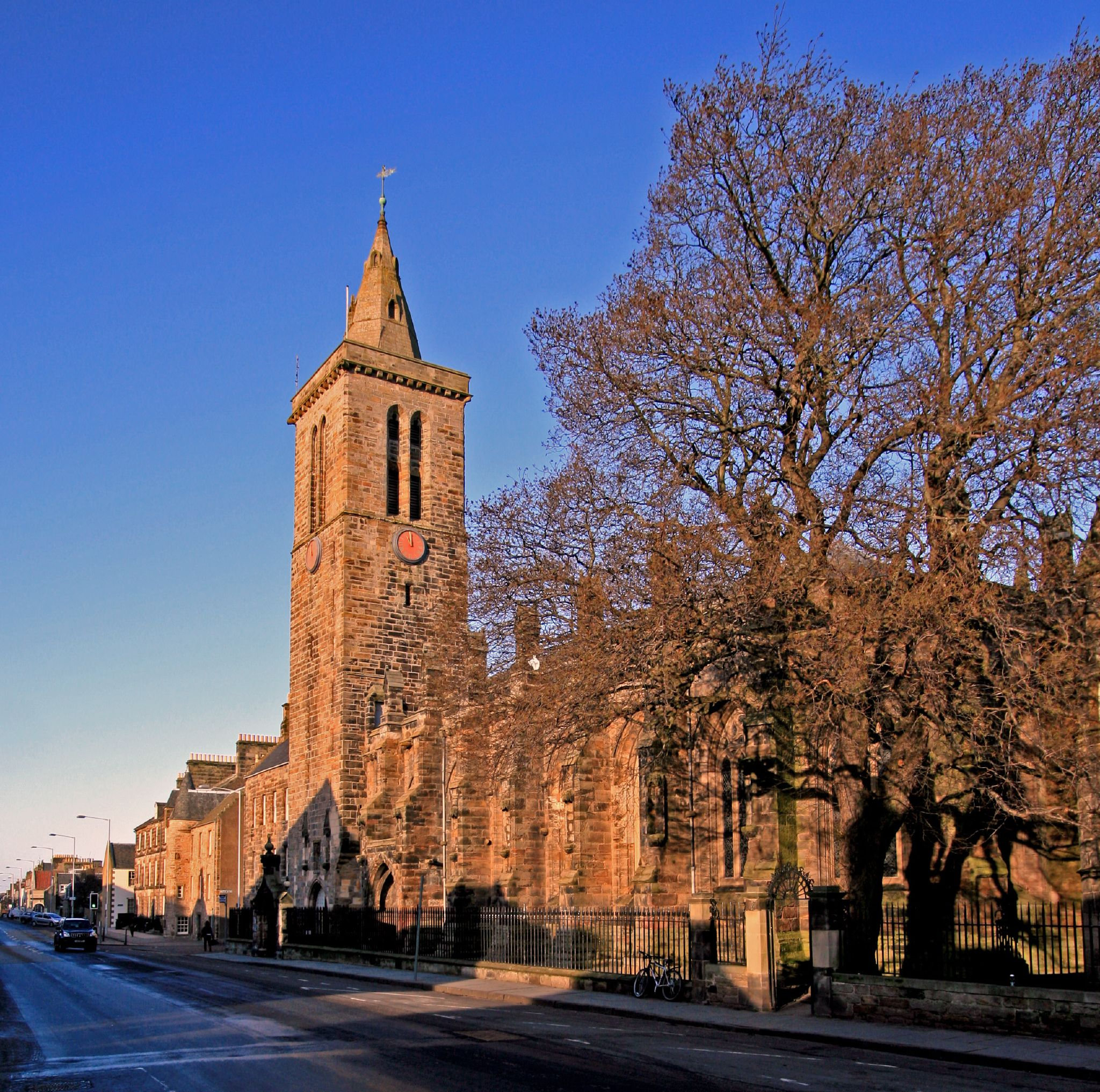
The University of St Andrews, Scotland's oldest university, opened in the early fifteenth century.

The history of universities in Scotland includes the development of all universities and university colleges in Scotland, between their foundation between the fifteenth century and the present day. Until the fifteenth century, those Scots who wished to attend university had to travel to England, or to the Continent. This situation was transformed by the founding of St John's College, St Andrews in 1418 by Henry Wardlaw, bishop of St. Andrews. St Salvator's College was added to St. Andrews in 1450. The other great bishoprics followed, with the University of Glasgow being founded in 1451 and King's College, Aberdeen in 1495. Initially, these institutions were designed for the training of clerics, but they would increasingly be used by laymen. International contacts helped integrate Scotland into a wider European scholarly world and would be one of the most important ways in which the new ideas of humanism were brought into Scottish intellectual life in the sixteenth century.

St Leonard's College was founded in St Andrews in 1512 and St John's College as St Mary's College, St Andrews was re-founded in 1538, as a humanist academy for the training of clerics. Public lectures that were established in Edinburgh in the 1540s would eventually become the University of Edinburgh in 1582. After the Reformation, Scotland's universities underwent reforms associated with Andrew Melville, who was influenced by the anti-Aristotelian Petrus Ramus. In 1617 James VI decreed that the town college of Edinburgh should be known as King James's College. In 1641, the two colleges at Aberdeen were united by decree of Charles I (r. 1625–49), to form the "King Charles University of Aberdeen". Under the Commonwealth (1652–60), the universities saw an improvement in their funding. After the Restoration there was a purge of Presbyterians from the universities, but most of the intellectual advances of the preceding period were preserved. The colleges at St. Andrews were demerged. The five Scottish university colleges recovered from the disruption of the civil war years and Restoration with a lecture-based curriculum that was able to embrace economics and science, offering a high-quality liberal education to the sons of the nobility and gentry.

In the eighteenth century the universities went from being small and parochial institutions, largely for the training of clergy and lawyers, to major intellectual centres at the forefront of Scottish identity and life, seen as fundamental to democratic principles and the opportunity for social advancement for the talented. Chairs of medicine were founded at all the university towns. By the 1740s Edinburgh medical school was the major centre of medicine in Europe and was a leading centre in the Atlantic world. Access to Scottish universities was probably more open than in contemporary England, Germany or France. Attendance was less expensive and the student body more representative of society as a whole. The system was flexible and the curriculum became a modern philosophical and scientific one, in keeping with contemporary needs for improvement and progress. Scotland reaped the intellectual benefits of this system in its contribution to the European Enlightenment. Many of the key figures of the Scottish Enlightenment were university professors, who developed their ideas in university lectures.

At the beginning of the nineteenth century, Scotland's five university colleges had no entrance exam, students typically entered at ages of 15 or 16, attended for as little as two years, chose which lectures to attend and left without qualifications. The curriculum was dominated by divinity and the law and there was a concerted attempt to modernise the curriculum, particularly by introducing degrees in the physical sciences and the need to reform the system to meet the needs of the emerging middle classes and the professions. The result of these reforms was a revitalisation of the Scottish university system, which expanded to 6,254 students by the end of the century and produced leading figures in both the arts and sciences. In the first half of the twentieth century Scottish universities fell behind those in England and Europe in terms of participation and investment. After the Robbins Report of 1963 there was a rapid expansion in higher education in Scotland. By the end of the decade the number of Scottish Universities had doubled. New universities included the University of Dundee, Strathclyde, Heriot-Watt, Stirling. From the 1970s the government preferred to expand higher education in the non-university sector and by the late 1980s roughly half of students in higher education were in colleges. In 1992, under the Further and Higher Education Act 1992, the distinction between universities and colleges was removed, creating new universities at Abertay, Glasgow Caledonian, Napier, Paisley and Robert Gordon.

== History ==
=== Middle Ages ===
==== Background ====
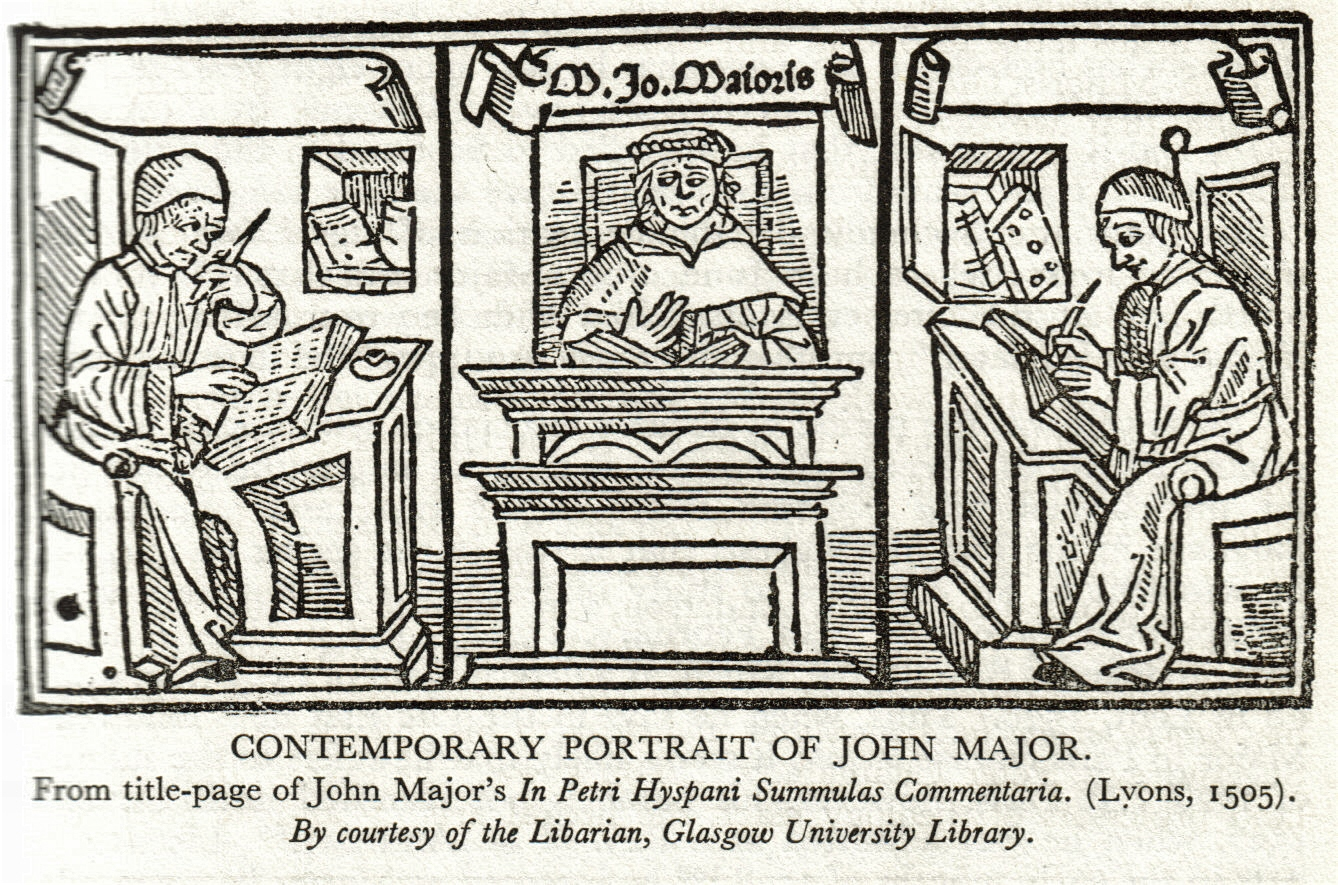
John Mair, one of the most successful products of the Medieval Scottish educational system

From the end of the eleventh century, universities had been founded across Europe, developing as semi-autonomous centres of learning, often teaching theology, mathematics, law and medicine. Until the fifteenth century, those Scots who wished to attend university had to travel to England, to Oxford or Cambridge, or to the Continent. Just over 1,000 students have been identified as doing so between the twelfth century and 1410. Among the destinations Paris was the most important, but also Cologne, Orléans, Wittenberg, Louvain and Vienna.

Among these travelling scholars, the most important intellectual figure was John Duns Scotus (c. 1266–1308), who studied at Oxford, Cambridge and Paris. He probably died at Cologne in 1308, after becoming a major influence on late medieval religious thought. After the outbreak of the Wars of Independence (1296–1357), with occasional exceptions under safe conduct, English universities were closed to Scots and continental universities became more significant. Some Scottish scholars became teachers in continental universities. At Paris, this included John de Rait (died c. 1355) and Walter Wardlaw (died c. 1387) in the 1340s and 1350s, William de Tredbrum in the 1380s and Laurence de Lindores (1372–1437) in the early 1500s. The continued movement to other universities produced a school of Scottish nominalists at Paris in the early sixteenth century, of which John Mair (1467–1550) was the most important figure. He had probably studied at a Scottish grammar school and then Cambridge, before moving to Paris where he matriculated in 1493.

==== First Scottish universities ====
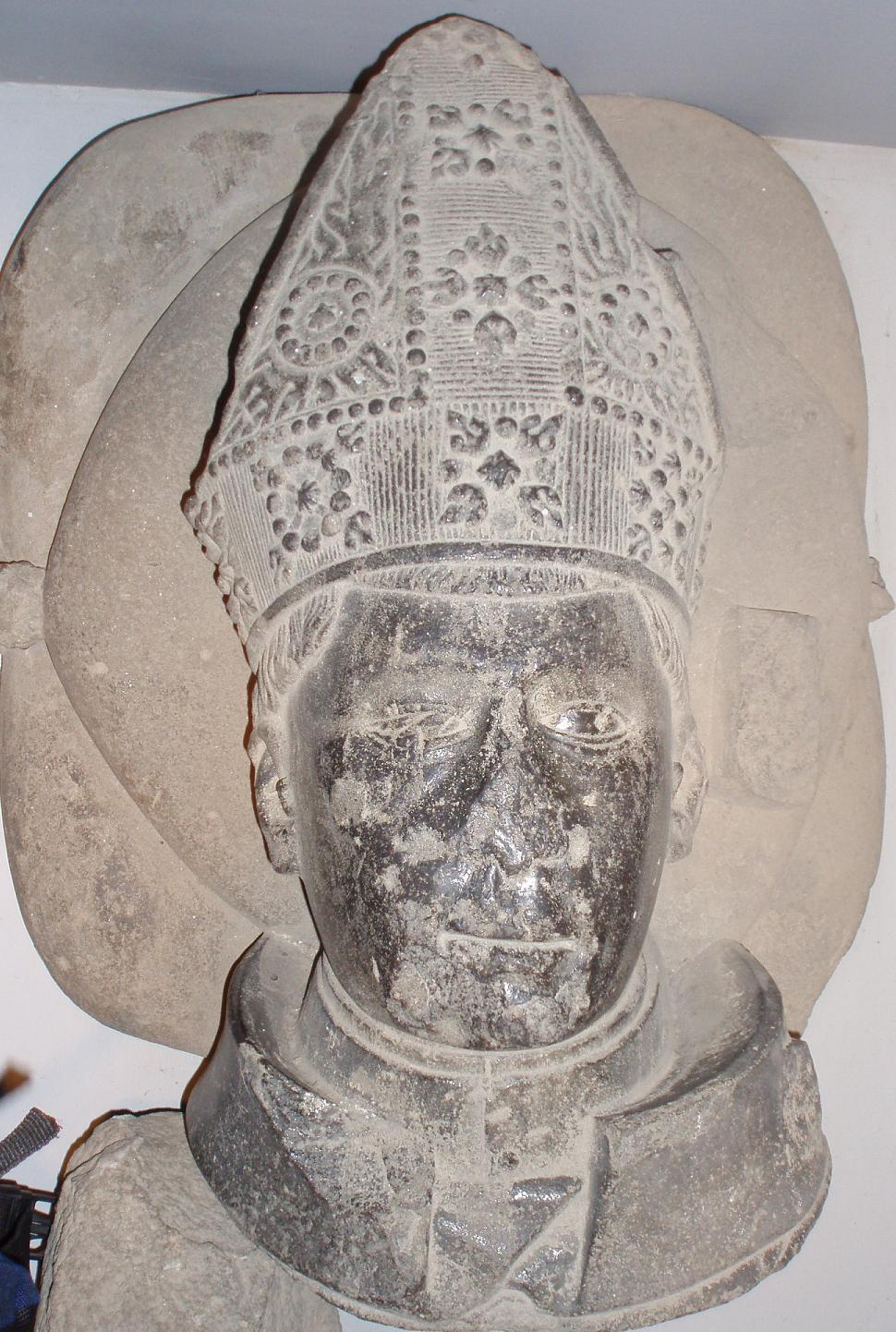
Bust of Bishop Henry Wardlaw, founder of St. Andrews University

This situation was transformed by the founding of St John's College, St Andrews in 1418. Henry Wardlaw, bishop of St. Andrews, petitioned the anti-Pope Benedict XIII during the later stages of the Great Western Schism, when Scotland was one of his few remaining supporters. Wardlaw argued that Scottish scholars in other universities were being persecuted for their loyalty to the anti-Pope. St Salvator's College was added to St. Andrews in 1450. The other great bishoprics followed, with the University of Glasgow being founded in 1451 and King's College, Aberdeen in 1495. Both were also papal foundations, by Nicholas V and Alexander VI respectively. St. Andrews was deliberately modelled on Paris, and although Glasgow adopted the statues of the University of Bologna, there, like Aberdeen, there was an increasing Parisian influence, partly because all its early regents had been educated in Paris. Initially, these institutions were designed for the training of clerics, but they would increasingly be used by laymen who began to challenge the clerical monopoly of administrative posts in government and law. They provided only basic degrees. Those wanting to study for the more advanced degrees that were common amongst European scholars still needed to go to universities in other countries. As a result, Scottish scholars continued to visit the Continent and returned to English universities after they reopened to Scots in the late fifteenth century.

By the fifteenth century, beginning in northern Italy, universities had become strongly influenced by humanist thinking. This put an emphasis on classical authors, questioning some of the accepted certainties of established thinking and manifesting itself in the teaching of new subjects, particularly through the medium of the Greek language. However, in this period, Scottish universities largely had a Latin curriculum, designed for the clergy, civil and common lawyers. They did not teach the Greek that was fundamental to the new humanist scholarship, focusing on metaphysics and putting a largely unquestioning faith in the works of Aristotle, whose authority would be challenged in the Renaissance. Towards the end of the fifteenth century, a humanist influence was becoming more evident. A major figure was Archibald Whitelaw, a teacher at St. Andrews and Cologne who later became a tutor to the young James III and served as royal secretary from 1462 to 1493. By 1497, the humanist and historian Hector Boece, born in Dundee and who had studied at Paris, returned to become the first principal at the new university of Aberdeen. In 1518 Mair returned to Scotland to become principal of the University of Glasgow. He transferred to St. Andrews in 1523 and in 1533 he was made Provost of St Salvator's College. While in Scotland his students included John Knox and George Buchanan. These international contacts helped integrate Scotland into a wider European scholarly world and would be one of the most important ways in which the new ideas of humanism were brought into Scottish intellectual life in the sixteenth century.

=== Early modern era ===
==== Renaissance ====
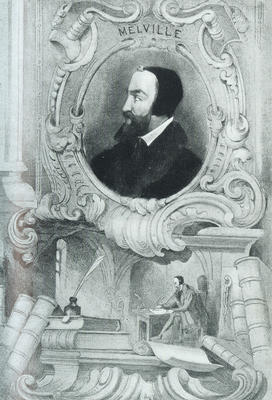
Andrew Melville, credited with major reforms in Scottish Universities in the sixteenth century

The civic values of humanism, which stressed the importance of order and morality, began to have a major impact on education and would become dominant in universities and schools by the end of the sixteenth century. By 1497 the humanist and historian Hector Boece, born in Dundee and who had studied at Paris, returned to become the first principal at the new university of Aberdeen. Another major figure was Archibald Whitelaw, a teacher at St. Andrews and Cologne who later became a tutor to the young James III and served as royal secretary from 1462 to 1493. King's College Aberdeen was refounded in 1515. In addition to the basic arts curriculum it offered theology, civil and canon law and medicine. St Leonard's College was founded in St Andrews in 1511 by Archbishop Alexander Stewart. John Douglas led the refoundation of St John's College as St Mary's College, St Andrews in 1538, as a humanist academy for the training of clerics, with a stress on biblical study. Robert Reid, Abbot of Kinloss and later Bishop of Orkney, was responsible in the 1520s and 1530s for bringing the Italian humanist Giovanni Ferrario to teach at Kinloss Abbey, where he established an impressive library and wrote works of Scottish history and biography. Reid was also instrumental in organising the public lectures that were established in Edinburgh in the 1540s on law, Greek, Latin and philosophy, under the patronage of the queen consort Mary of Guise. These developed into the "Tounis College" of the city, which would eventually become the University of Edinburgh. In 1592, Fraserburgh University was established, but it was short-lived.

==== Reformation ====
In the mid-sixteenth century, Scotland underwent a Protestant Reformation that rejected Papal authority and many aspects of Catholic theology and practice. It created a predominately Calvinist national church, known as the kirk, which was strongly Presbyterian in outlook, severely reducing the powers of bishops, although not initially abolishing them. After the Reformation, Scotland's universities underwent a series of reforms associated with Andrew Melville, who returned from Geneva to become principal of the University of Glasgow in 1574. A distinguished linguist, philosopher and poet, he had trained in Paris and studied law at Poitiers, before moving to Geneva and developing an interest in Protestant theology. Influenced by the anti-Aristotelian Petrus Ramus, he placed an emphasis on simplified logic and elevated languages and sciences to the same status as philosophy, allowing accepted ideas in all areas to be challenged. He introduced new specialist teaching staff, replacing the system of "regenting", where one tutor took the students through the entire arts curriculum. Metaphysics were abandoned and Greek became compulsory in the first year followed by Aramaic, Syriac and Hebrew, launching a new fashion for ancient and biblical languages. Enrollment rates at the University of Glasgow had been declining before his arrival, but students now began to arrive in large numbers. He assisted in the reconstruction of Marischal College, Aberdeen, founded as a second university college in the city in 1593 by George Keith, 5th Earl Marischal, and, to do for St Andrews what he had done for Glasgow, he was appointed Principal of St Mary's College, St Andrews in 1580. In 1582, Edinburgh town council received a royal charter from King James VI for the establishment of a university, while earlier university had been created through papal bulls. Instruction at the resulting Tounis College began in 1583, and the institution eventually became the University of Edinburgh. Melville's reforms produced a revitalisation of all Scottish universities, which were now providing a quality of education equal to the most esteemed higher education institutions anywhere in Europe.

==== Seventeenth century ====
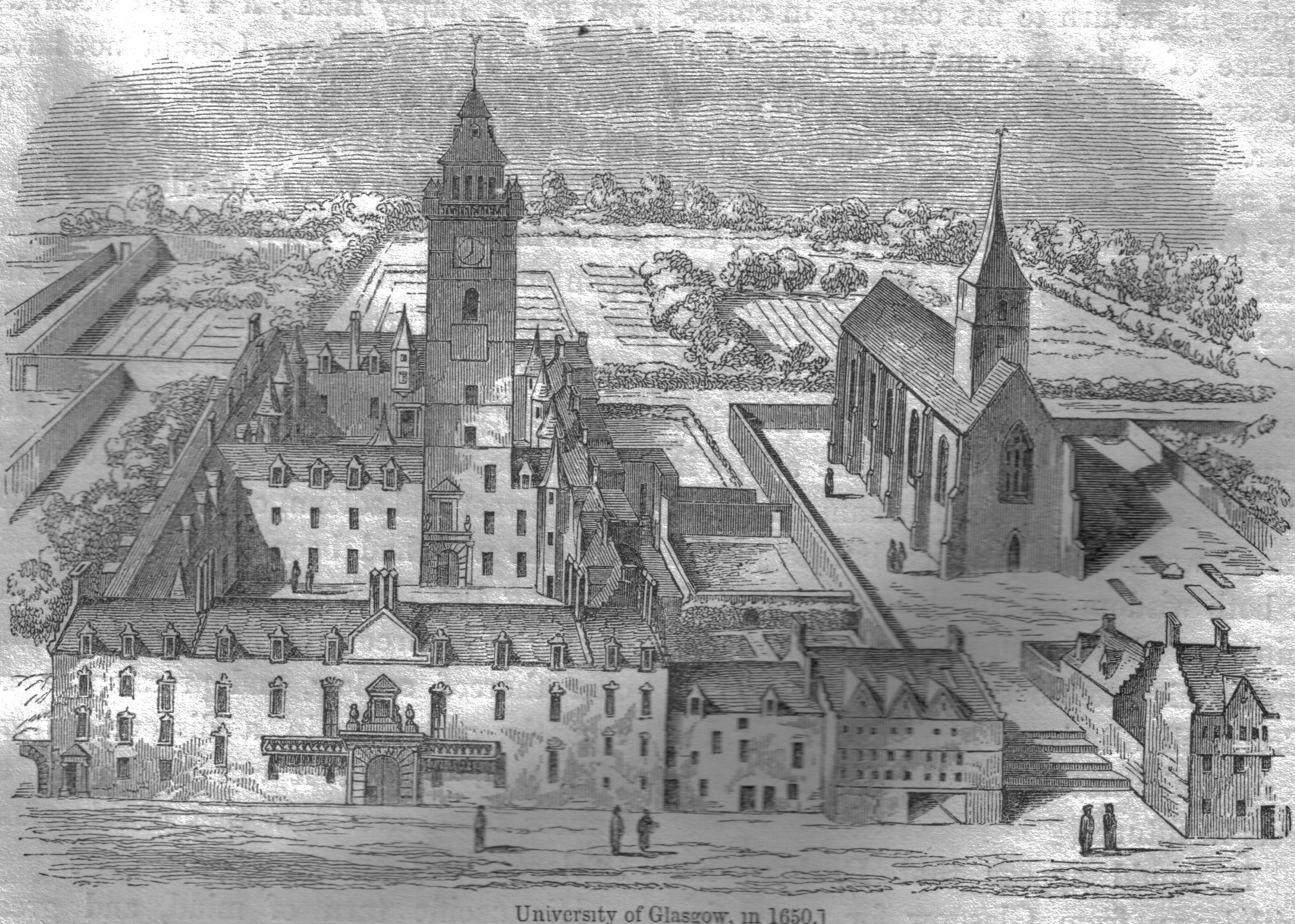
The High Street college of the University of Glasgow, completed under the Commonwealth

King James VI's major contribution to the universities was to combat militant Presbyterianism by insisting that the catechism God and the King must be read in the schools and universities. He also decreed, in 1617, that the town college of Edinburgh should be known as King James's College. In 1641, the two colleges at Aberdeen were united by decree of Charles I (r. 1625–49), to form the "King Charles University of Aberdeen". Under the Commonwealth (1652–60), the universities saw an improvement in their funding, as they were given income from deaneries, defunct bishoprics and the excise, allowing the completion of buildings including the college in the High Street in Glasgow. They were still largely seen as training schools for clergy, and came under the control of the hard line Protesters, who were generally favoured by the regime because of their greater antipathy to royalism, with leading protester Patrick Gillespie being made Principal at Glasgow in 1652. After the Restoration there was a purge of Presbyterians from the universities, but most of the intellectual advances of the preceding period were preserved. There was considerable mistrust between the two colleges in Aberdeen, which was sufficient to produce an armed riot over the poaching of students in 1659. The two institutions were formally demerged by the Rescissory Act 1661.

The five Scottish university colleges recovered from the disruption of the civil war years and Restoration with a lecture-based curriculum that was able to embrace economics and science, offering a high-quality liberal education to the sons of the nobility and gentry. All saw the establishment or re-establishment of chairs of mathematics. The first was at Marshall College in 1613. A university chair was added at St. Andrews in 1668, at Edinburgh in 1674 and at Glasgow in 1691. The chair at Glasgow was first taken by the polymath George Sinclair, who had been deposed from his position in philosophy for his Presbyterianism in 1666, but was able to return after the Glorious Revolution marked a move against episcopalianism. A further chair would be added at King's College, Aberdeen in 1703. Astronomy was facilitated by the building of observatories at St. Andrews (c. 1677) and at King's College (1675) and Marischal College (1694) in Aberdeen. Robert Sibbald was appointed as the first Professor of Medicine at Edinburgh and he co-founded the Royal College of Physicians of Edinburgh in 1681. These developments helped the universities to become major centres of medical education and would put Scotland at the forefront of Enlightenment thinking.

=== Modern era ===
==== Eighteenth century ====
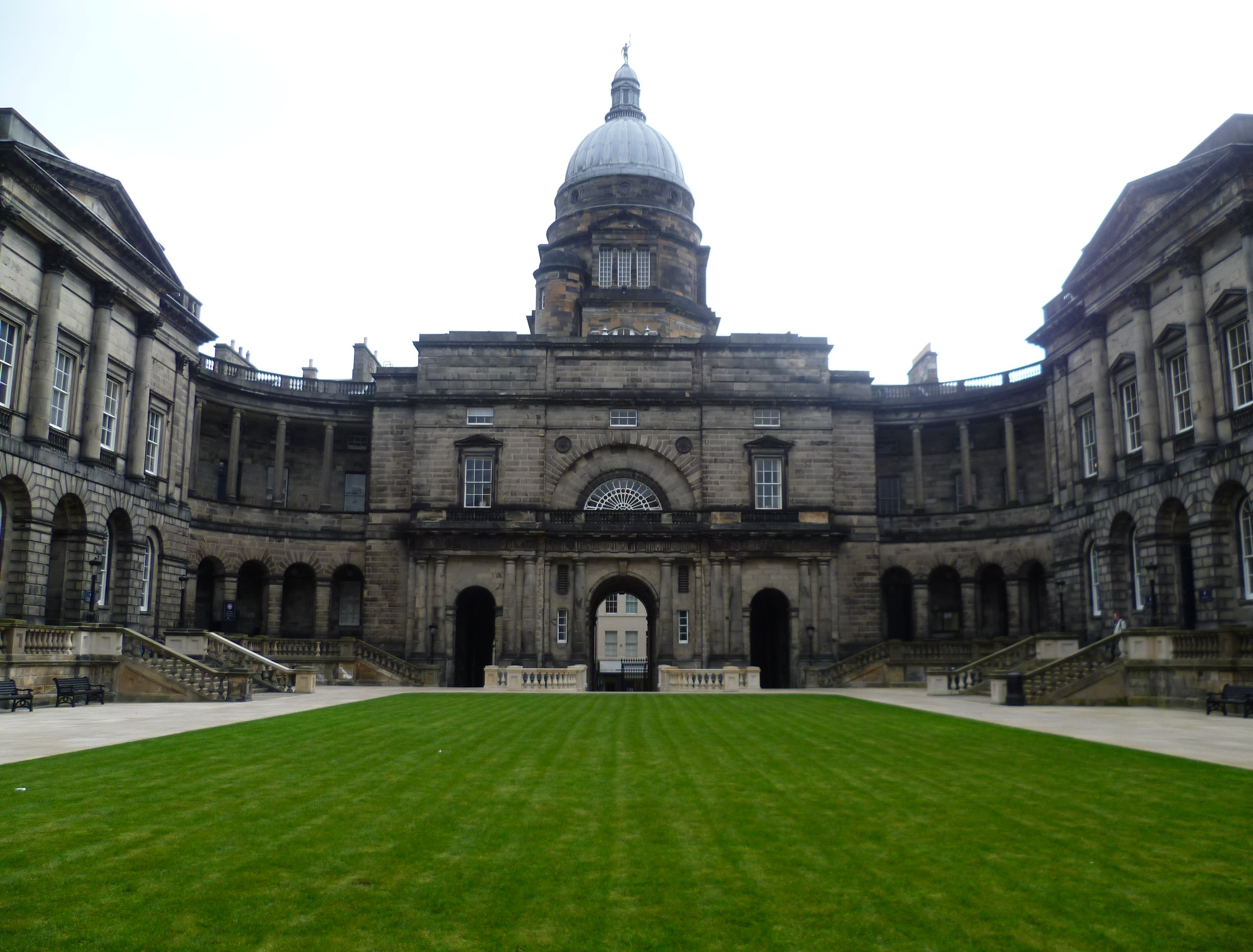
Old College, University of Edinburgh, built to plans drawn up by Robert Adam and completed in the nineteenth century

In the eighteenth century the universities went from being small and parochial institutions, largely for the training of clergy and lawyers, to major intellectual centres at the forefront of Scottish identity and life, seen as fundamental to democratic principles and the opportunity for social advancement for the talented. Chairs of medicine were founded at Marsichial College (1700), Glasgow (1713), St. Andrews (1722) and a chair of chemistry and medicine at Edinburgh (1713). It was Edinburgh's medical school, founded in 1732, that came to dominate. By the 1740s it had displaced Leiden as the major centre of medicine in Europe and was a leading centre in the Atlantic world. The universities still had their difficulties. The economic down turn in the mid-century forced the closure of St Leonard's College in St Andrews, whose properties and staff were merged into St Salvator's College to form the United College of St Salvator and St Leonard.

Access to Scottish universities was probably more socially open than in contemporary England, Germany or France. Attendance was less expensive and the student body more representative of society as a whole. Humbler students were aided by a system of bursaries established for the training of the clergy. In this period residence became divorced from the colleges and students were able to live much more cheaply and largely unsupervised, at home, with friends or in lodgings in the university towns. The system was flexible and the curriculum became a modern philosophical and scientific one, in keeping with contemporary needs for improvement and progress. Scotland reaped the intellectual benefits of this system in its contribution to the European Enlightenment.

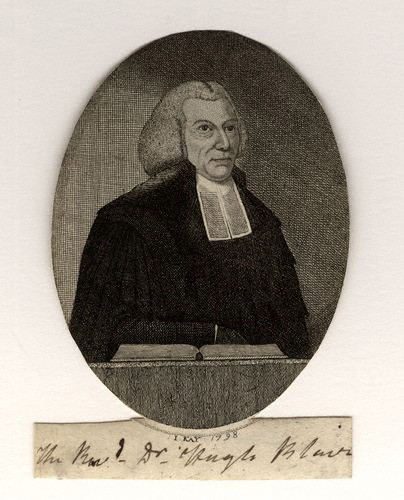
Hugh Blair, Professor of Rhetoric and Belles Lettres at the University of Edinburgh

Many of the key figures of the Scottish Enlightenment were university professors, who developed their ideas in university lectures. The first major philosopher of the Scottish Enlightenment was Francis Hutcheson (1694–1746), who held the Chair of Philosophy at the University of Glasgow from 1729 to 1746. He was a moral philosopher who produced alternatives to the ideas of Thomas Hobbes. One of his major contributions to world thought was the utilitarian and consequentialist principle that virtue is that which provides, "the greatest happiness for the greatest numbers". Much of what is incorporated in the scientific method (the nature of knowledge, evidence, experience, and causation) and some modern attitudes towards the relationship between science and religion were developed by his protégés David Hume (1711–76) and Adam Smith (1723–90). Hugh Blair (1718–1800) was a minister of the Church of Scotland and held the Chair of Rhetoric and Belles Lettres at the University of Edinburgh. He produced an edition of the works of Shakespeare and is best known for Sermons (1777–1801), a five-volume endorsement of practical Christian morality, and Lectures on Rhetoric and Belles Lettres (1783), an essay on literary composition, which was to have a major impact on the work of Adam Smith. He was also one of the figures who first drew the Ossian cycle of James Macpherson to public attention.

Hume became a major figure in the sceptical philosophical and empiricist traditions of philosophy. His scepticism prevented him from obtaining chairs at Glasgow and Edinburgh. He and other Scottish Enlightenment thinkers developed what he called a 'science of man', which was expressed historically in works by authors including James Burnett, Adam Ferguson, John Millar and William Robertson, all of whom merged a scientific study of how humans behave in ancient and primitive cultures with a strong awareness of the determining forces of modernity. Indeed, modern sociology largely originated from this movement. Adam Smith's The Wealth of Nations (1776) is considered to be the first work of modern economics. It had an immediate impact on British economic policy and still frames twenty-first century discussions on globalisation and tariffs. The focus of the Scottish Enlightenment ranged from intellectual and economic matters to the specifically scientific as in the work of William Cullen, physician and chemist, James Anderson, an agronomist, Joseph Black, physicist and chemist, and James Hutton, the first modern geologist.

==== Nineteenth century ====
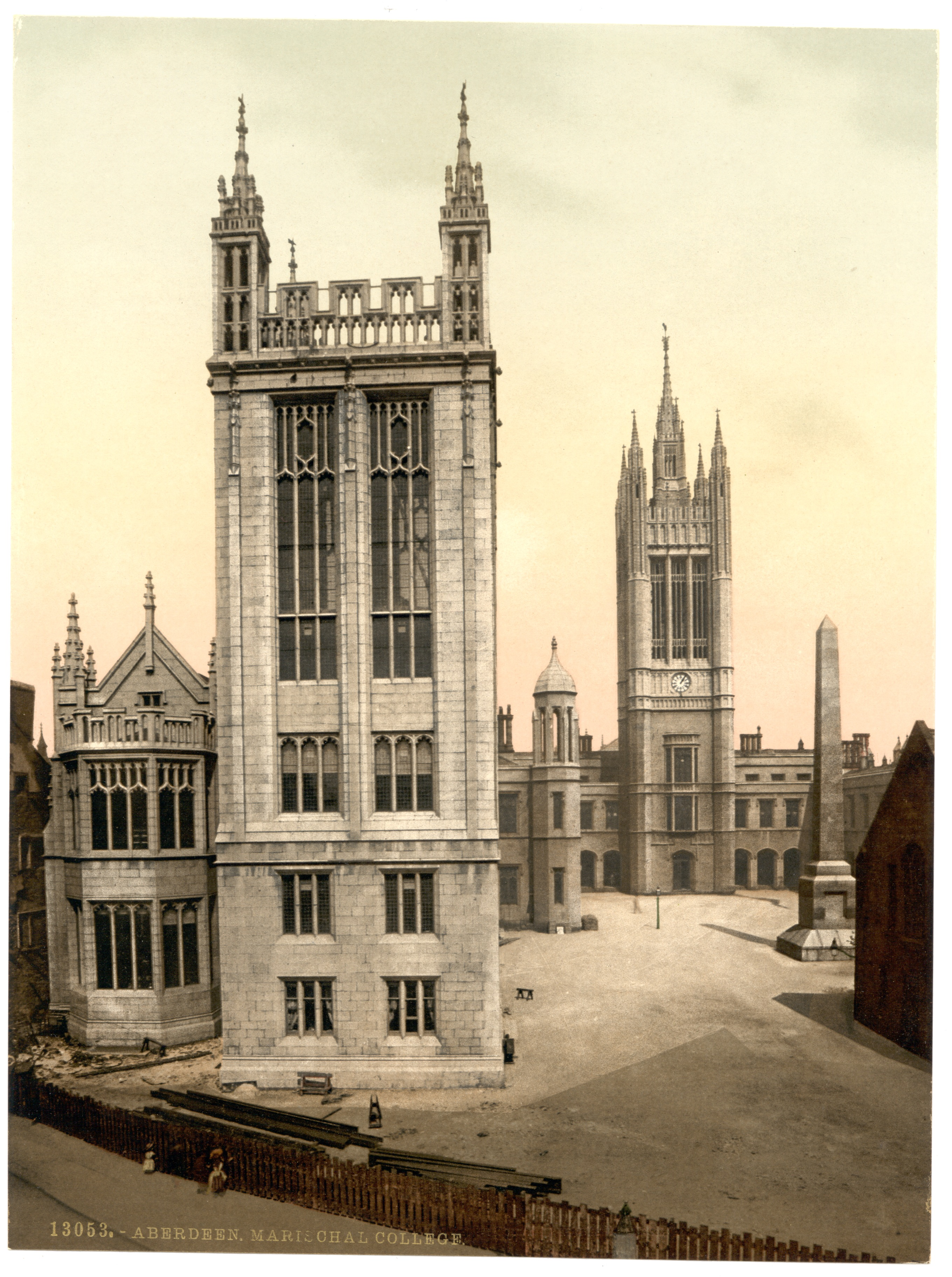
Marischal College with the new front under construction; c. 1900

At the beginning of the nineteenth century, Scotland's five university colleges had about 3,000 students between them. They had no entrance exam, students typically entered at ages of 15 or 16, attended for as little as two years, chose which lectures to attend and left without qualifications. Although Scottish universities had gained a formidable reputation in the eighteenth century, the curriculum was dominated by divinity and the law and there was a concerted attempt to modernise the curriculum, particularly by introducing degrees in the physical sciences and the need to reform the system to meet the needs of the emerging middle classes and the professions. The result was two commissions of inquiry in 1826 and 1876 and reforming acts of parliament in 1858 and 1889.

The curriculum and system of graduation were reformed. Entrance examinations that were equivalent to the School Leaving Certificate were introduced and average ages of entry rose to 17 or 18. Standard patterns of graduation in the arts curriculum offered three-year ordinary and four-year honours degrees. There was resistance among professors, particularly among chairs of divinity and classics, to the introduction of new subjects, especially the physical sciences. The crown established Regius chairs, all in the sciences, including medicine, chemistry, natural history and botany. The chair of Engineering at Glasgow was the first of its kind in the world. By the 1870s the physical sciences were well established in Scottish universities, whereas in England the battle to modernise the curriculum would not be complete until the end of the century. The new separate science faculties were able to move away from the compulsory Latin, Greek and philosophy of the old MA curriculum. Under the commissions, all the universities were restructured. They were given Courts, which included external members and who oversaw the finances of the institution. Students' representative councils were founded in 1884 and ratified under the 1889 act. Under this act new arts subjects were established, with chairs in Modern History, French, German and Political Economy.

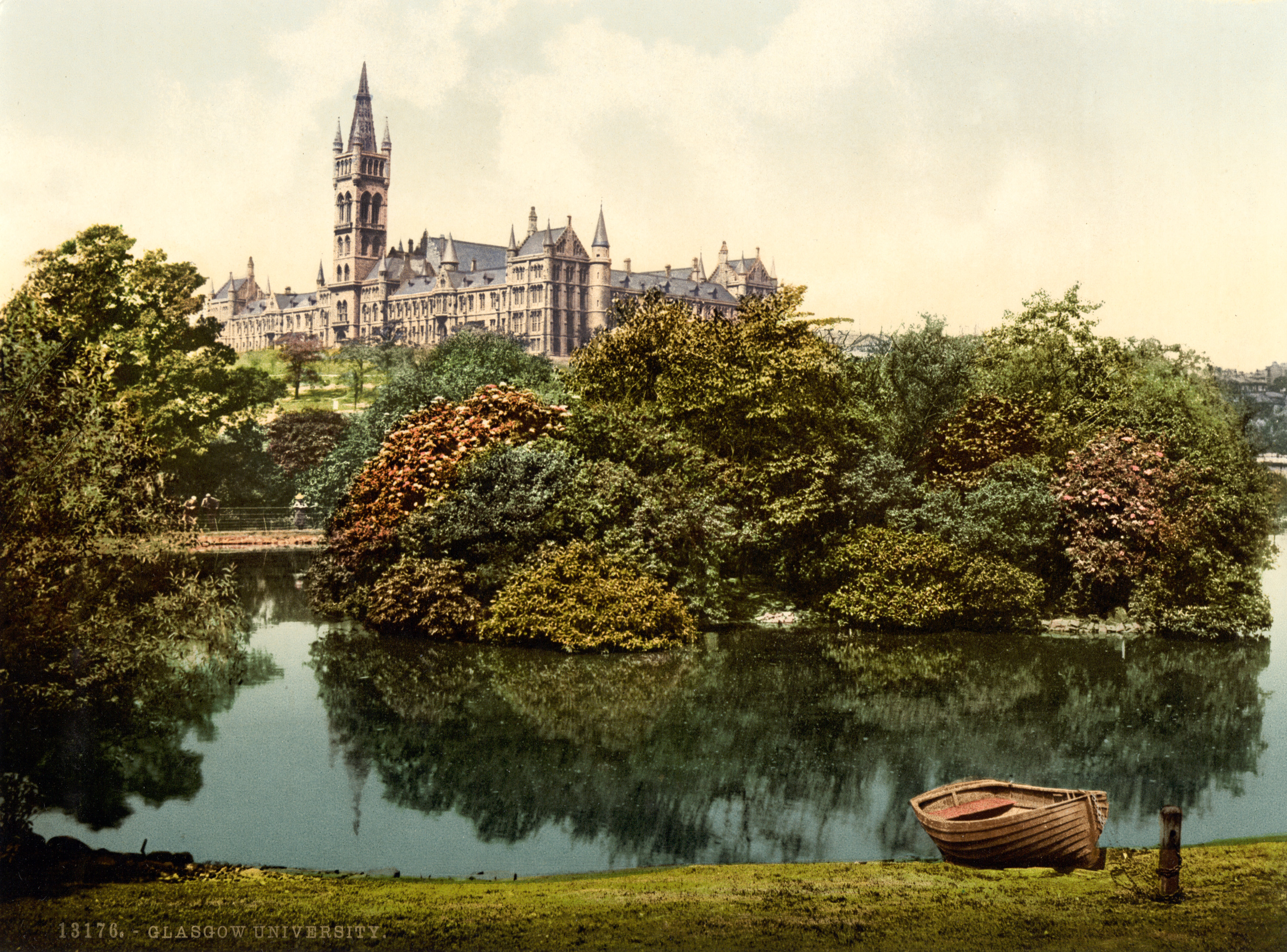
The new buildings of the University of Glasgow at Gilmorehill, c. 1895

The University of St Andrews was at a low point in its fortunes in the early part of the century. It was restructured by commissioners appointed under the 1858 act and began a revival. It pioneered the admission of women to Scottish universities, creating the Lady Literate in Arts (LLA) in 1882, which proved highly popular. From 1892 Scottish universities could all admit and graduate women, with St Andrews the first to do so, and the numbers of women at Scottish universities steadily increased from this point until the early twentieth century. A new college of St Andrews was opened in the thriving burgh of Dundee in 1883, allowing the university to teach sciences and open a medical school. The University of Glasgow became a leader in British higher education by providing the educational needs of youth from the urban and commercial classes. It moved from the city centre to a new set of grand neo-Gothic buildings, paid for largely by public subscription, at Gilmorehill in 1870. The two colleges at Aberdeen were considered too small to be viable and they were restructured as the University of Aberdeen in 1860. Marischal College was rebuilt in the Gothic style from 1900. Unlike the other Medieval and ecclesiastical foundations, because the University of Edinburgh was a civic college it was relatively poor. In 1858 it was taken out of the care of the city and established on a similar basis to the other ancient universities.

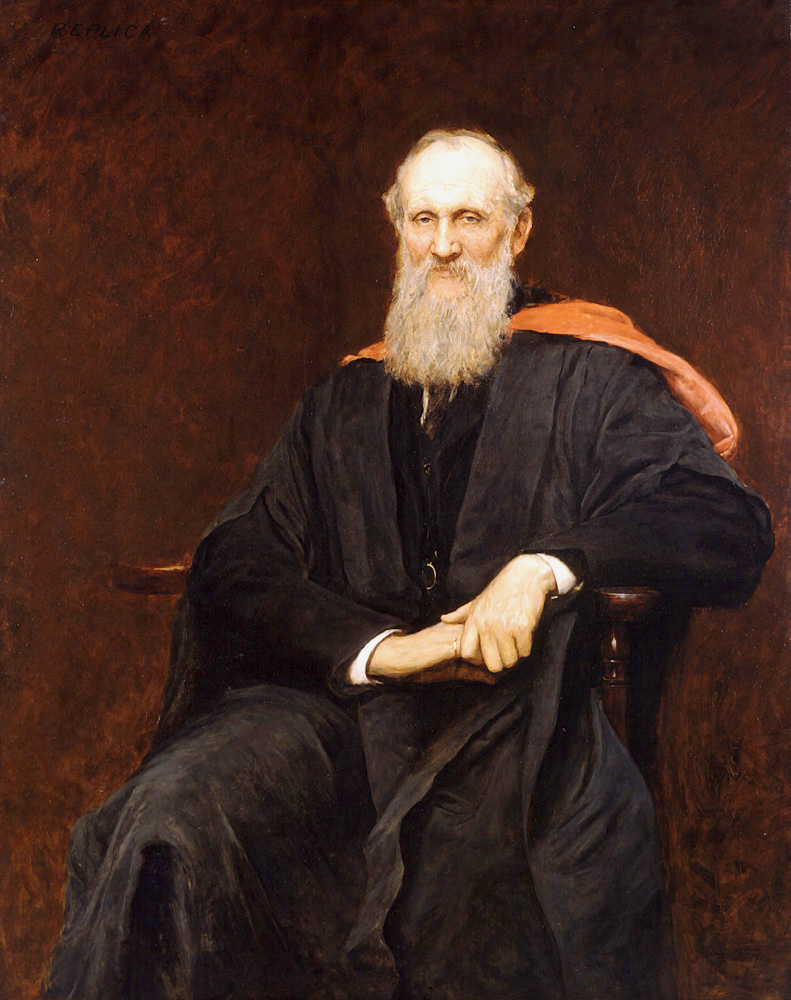
Lord Kelvin by Hubert von Herkomer

The result of these reforms was a revitalisation of the Scottish university system, which expanded to 6,254 students by the end of the century and produced leading figures in both the arts and sciences. The chair of Engineering at Glasgow became highly distinguished under its second incumbent William John Macquorn Rankine (1820–72), who held the position from 1859 to 1872 and became the leading figure in heat engines and founder president of the Institution of Engineers and Shipbuilders in Scotland. Thomas Thomson (1773–1852) was the first Professor of Chemistry at Glasgow and in 1831 founded the Shuttle Street laboratories, perhaps the first of their kind in the world. His students founded practical chemistry at Aberdeen soon after. William Thomson, 1st Baron Kelvin was appointed to the chair of natural philosophy at Glasgow aged only 22. His work included the mathematical analysis of electricity and formulation of the first and second laws of thermodynamics. By 1870 Kelvin and Rankine had made Glasgow the leading centre of science and engineering education and investigation in Britain.

At Edinburgh, major figures included David Brewster (1781–1868), who made contributions to the science of optics and to the development of photography. Fleeming Jenkin (1833–85) was the first professor of engineering at the university and among wide interests helped develop ocean telegraphs and mechanical drawing. In medicine Joseph Lister (1827–1912) and his student William Macewen (1848–1924), pioneered antiseptic surgery. The University of Edinburgh was also a major supplier of surgeons for the Royal Navy, and Robert Jameson (1774–1854), Professor of Natural History at Edinburgh, ensured that a large number of these were surgeon-naturalists, who were vital in the Humboldtian and imperial enterprise of investigating nature throughout the world. Major figures to emerge from Scottish universities in the science of humanity included the philosopher Edward Caird (1835–1908), the anthropologist James George Frazer (1854–1941) and the sociologist and urban planner Patrick Geddes (1854–1932).

==== Twentieth century to the present ====
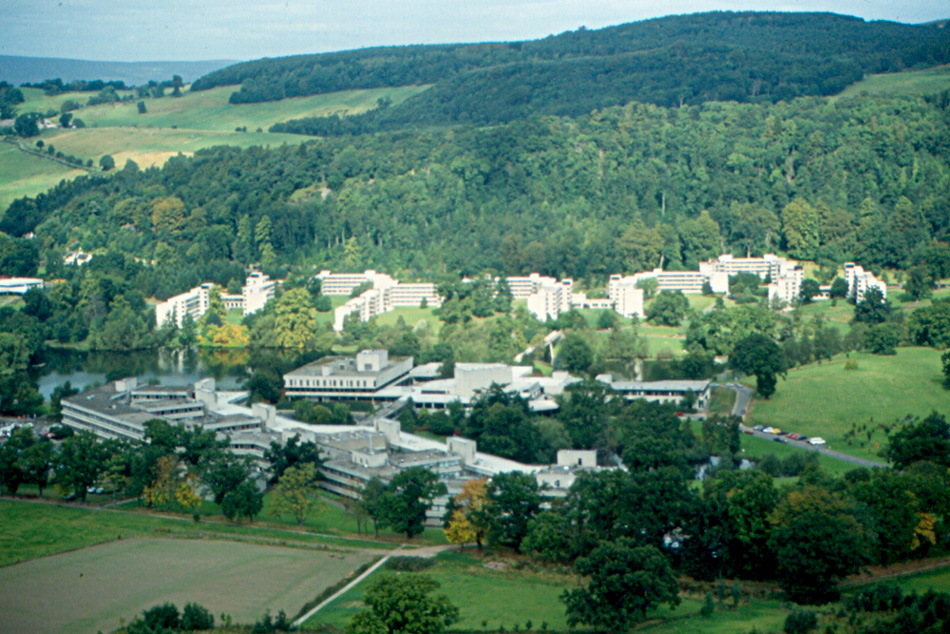
The purpose-built modern buildings of the University of Stirling

From 1901 large numbers of students received bursaries from the Carnegie Trust. By 1913 there were 7,776 students in Scottish universities. Of these 1,751 (23 per cent) were women. By the mid-1920s it had risen to a third. It then fell to 25–7 per cent in the 1930s as opportunities in school teaching, virtually the only careers outlet for female graduates in arts and sciences, decreased. No woman was appointed to a Scottish professorship until after 1945. The fall in numbers was most acute among women students, but it was part of a general trend. In the first half of the twentieth century Scottish universities fell behind those in England and Europe in terms of participation and investment. The decline of traditional industries between the wars undermined recruitment to subjects in which Scotland had been traditionally strong, such as science and engineering. English universities increased the numbers of students registered between 1924 and 1927 by 19 per cent, but in Scotland the number of full-time students fell from 10,400 in 1924 to 9,900 in 1937. In the same period, while expenditure in English universities rose by 90 per cent, in Scotland the increase was less than a third of that figure.

Before the First World War relationships between male and female students tended to be very formal, but in the inter-war years there was an increase in social activities, such as dance halls, cinemas, cafes and public houses. From the 1920s much drunken and high spirited activity was diverted into the annual charity gala or rag. Male centred activities included the Student's Union, Rugby Club and Officers' Training Corps. Women had their own unions and athletics clubs. Universities remained largely non-residential, although a few women's halls of residence were created, most not owned by the universities.

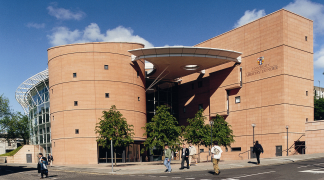
The student library at Abertay University

After the Robbins Report of 1963 there was a rapid expansion in higher education in Scotland. By the end of the decade the number of Scottish Universities had doubled. The University of Dundee was demerged from St. Andrews, Strathclyde and Heriot-Watt developing from technical colleges and the Stirling was begun as a completely new university on a greenfield site in 1966. From the 1970s the government preferred to expand higher education in the non-university sector of educational and technical colleges, which were cheaper because they undertook little research. By the late 1980s roughly half of students in higher education were in colleges. In 1992, under the Further and Higher Education Act 1992, the distinction between universities and colleges was removed. This created new universities at Abertay, Glasgow Caledonian, Napier, Paisley and Robert Gordon. Despite the expansion the number of male students experienced a downturn in growth from 1971 to 1990. The growth in female student numbers was much larger and continued until, by 1999 and 2000, the numbers of women students exceeded male students for the first time.

After devolution, in 1999 the new Scottish Executive set up an Education Department and an Enterprise, Transport and Lifelong Learning Department, which together took over its functions. One of the major diversions from practice in England, possible because of devolution, was the abolition of student tuition fees in 1999, instead retaining a system of means-tested student grants. In 2001 the University of the Highlands and Islands was created by a federation of 13 colleges and research institutions in the Highlands and Islands in 2001 and which gained full university status in 2011. In 2008–09, approximately 231,000 students studied at universities or institutes of higher education in Scotland, of which 56 per cent were female and 44 per cent male.
