= Universities in Scotland =

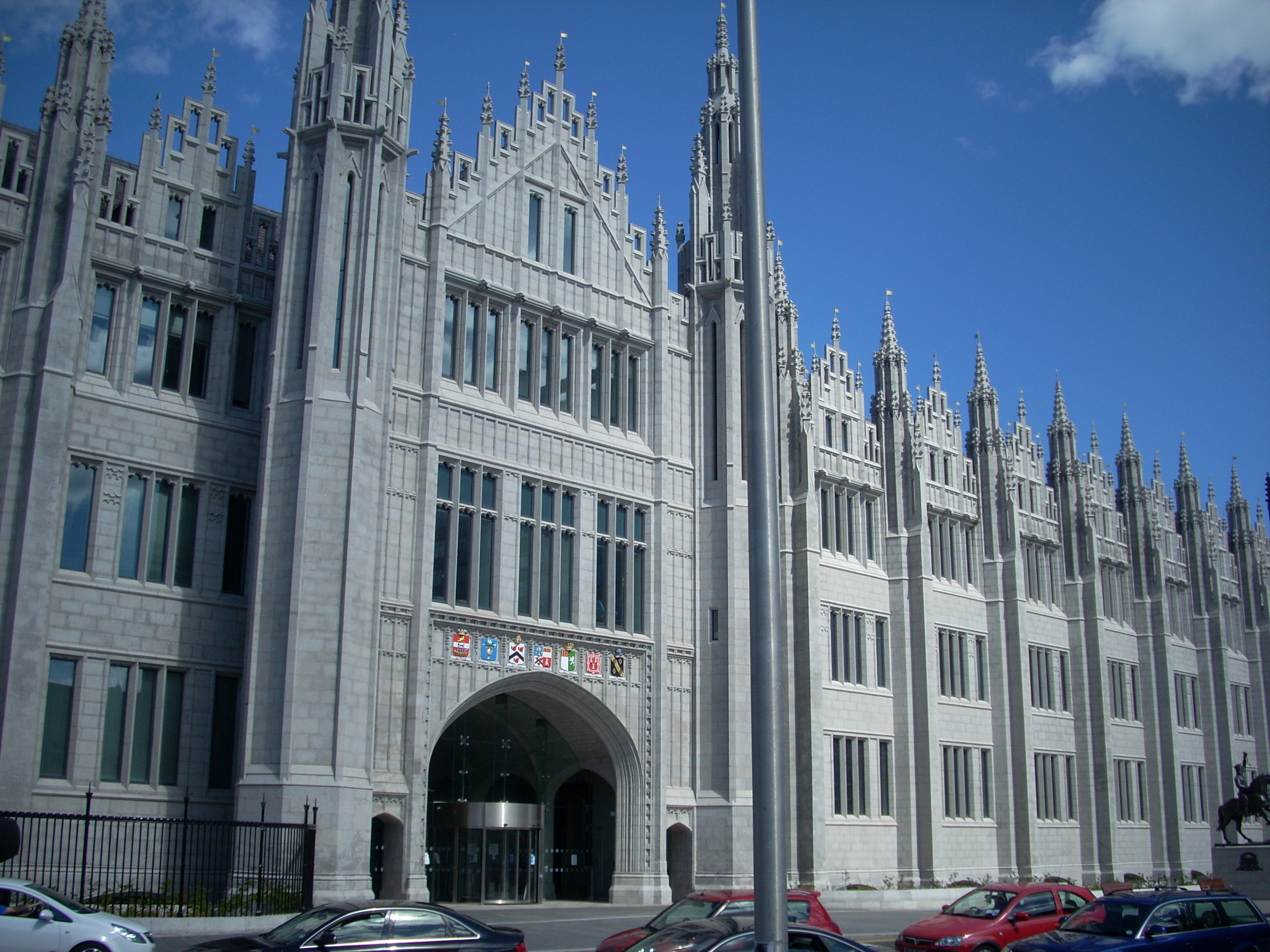
Marischal College, Aberdeen

There are fifteen universities in Scotland and three other institutions of higher education that have the authority to award academic degrees.

The first university college in Scotland was founded at St John's College, St Andrews in 1418 by Henry Wardlaw, bishop of St Andrews. St Salvator's College was added to St Andrews in 1450. The University of Glasgow was founded in 1451 and King's College, Aberdeen in 1495. St Leonard's College was founded in St Andrews in 1511 and St John's College was re-founded as St Mary's College, St Andrews in 1538, as a Humanist academy for the training of clerics. Public lectures that were established in Edinburgh in the 1540s, would eventually become the University of Edinburgh in 1582. After the Reformation, Scotland's universities underwent a series of reforms associated with Andrew Melville. After the Restoration there was a purge of Presbyterians from the universities, but most of the intellectual advances of the preceding period were preserved. The Scottish university colleges recovered from the disruption of the civil war years and Restoration with a lecture-based curriculum that was able to embrace economics and science, offering a high-quality liberal education to the sons of the nobility and gentry.

In the eighteenth century the universities went from being small and parochial institutions, largely for the training of clergy and lawyers, to major intellectual centres at the forefront of Scottish identity and life, seen as fundamental to democratic principles and the opportunity for social advancement for the talented. Many of the key figures of the Scottish Enlightenment were university professors, who developed their ideas in university lectures. At the beginning of the nineteenth century, Scotland's five university colleges had no entrance exams. Students typically entered at ages of 15 or 16, attended for as little as two years, chose which lectures to attend and left without qualifications. There was a concerted attempt to modernise the curriculum to meet the needs of the emerging middle classes and the professions. The result of these reforms was a revitalisation of the Scottish university system and growth in the number of students. In the first half of the twentieth century Scottish universities fell behind those in England and Europe in terms of participation and investment. After the Robbins Report of 1963 there was a rapid expansion in higher education in Scotland. By the end of the decade the number of Scottish universities had doubled. In 1992 the distinction between universities and colleges was removed, creating a series of new universities.

All Scottish universities are public and funded in part by the Scottish Government (through its Scottish Funding Council). In the 2023–24 academic year, approximately 281,500 students studied at universities or institutes of higher education in Scotland. Included in the figure are 173,800 students normally domiciled in Scotland, 33,100 from the rest of the United Kingdom and a further 73,900 international students. The sector employs, directly and indirectly, six per cent of all jobs in the Scottish economy.

== History ==
=== Middle Ages ===
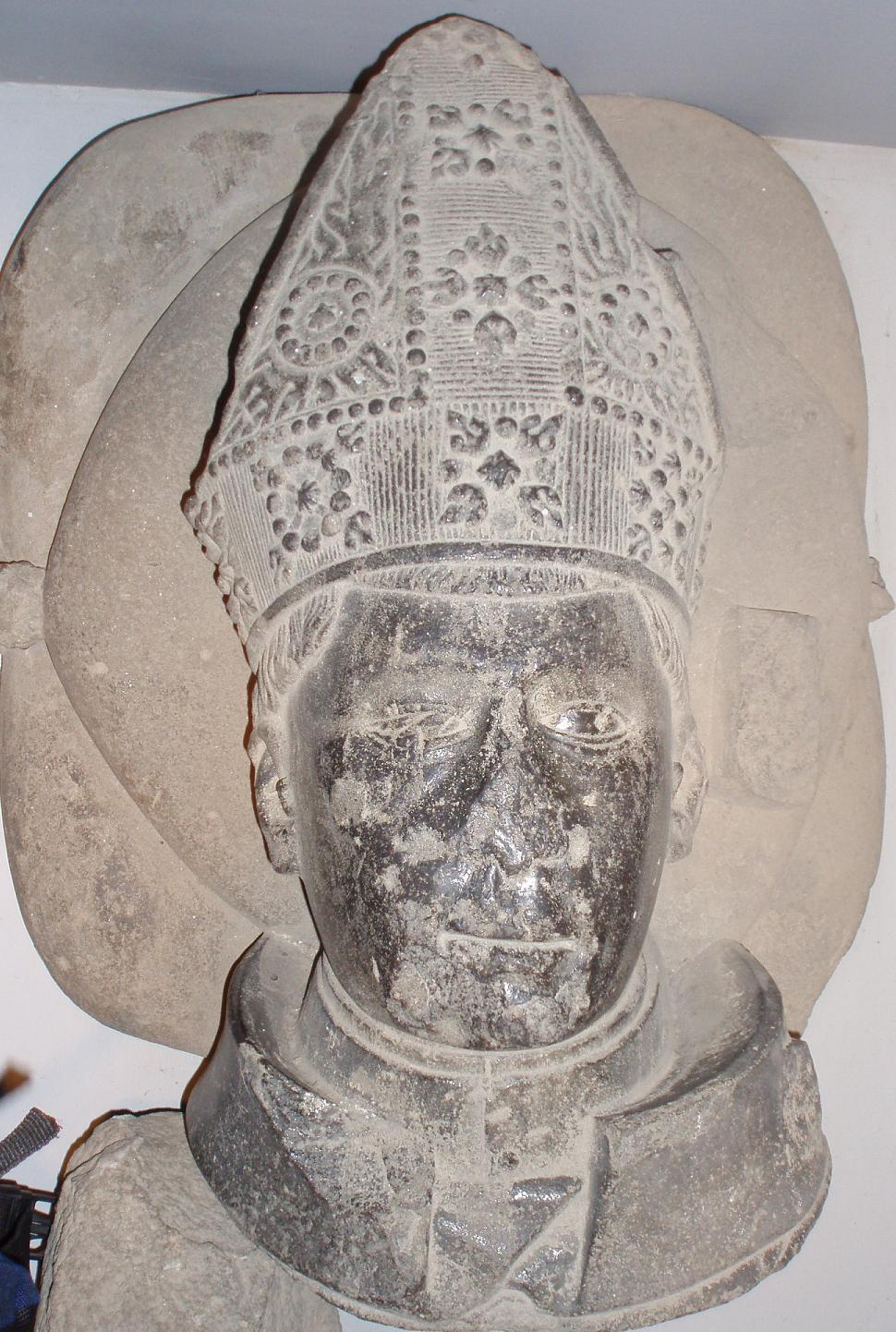
Bust of Bishop Henry Wardlaw, founder of St. Andrews University

Until the fifteenth century, Scots who wished to attend university had to travel to England or to the Continent. This situation was transformed by the founding of St John's College, St Andrews in 1418 by Henry Wardlaw, bishop of St. Andrews. St Salvator's College was added to St. Andrews in 1450. The other great bishoprics followed, with the University of Glasgow being founded in 1451 and King's College, Aberdeen in 1495. Initially, these institutions were designed for the training of clerics, but they would increasingly be used by laymen. International contacts helped integrate Scotland into a wider European scholarly world and would be one of the most important ways in which the new ideas of Humanism were brought into Scottish intellectual life in the sixteenth century.

=== Early modern era ===
St Leonard's College was founded in St Andrews in 1511 and St John's College was re-founded as St Mary's College, St Andrews in 1538, as a Humanist academy for the training of clerics. Public lectures that were established in Edinburgh in the 1540s would eventually become the University of Edinburgh in 1582. A university also briefly existed in Fraserburgh. After the Reformation, Scotland's universities underwent a series of reforms associated with Andrew Melville, who was influenced by the anti-Aristotelian Petrus Ramus. In 1617 King James VI decreed that the town college of Edinburgh should be known as King James's College. In 1641, the two colleges at Aberdeen were united by decree of Charles I (r. 1625–49), to form the "King Charles University of Aberdeen." Under the Commonwealth (1652–60), the universities saw an improvement in their funding. After the Restoration there was a purge of Presbyterians from the universities, but most of the intellectual advances of the preceding period were preserved. The colleges at Aberdeen were de-merged. The five Scottish university colleges recovered from the disruption of the civil war years and Restoration with a lecture-based curriculum that was able to embrace economics and science, offering a high-quality liberal education to the sons of the nobility and gentry.

=== Eighteenth century ===
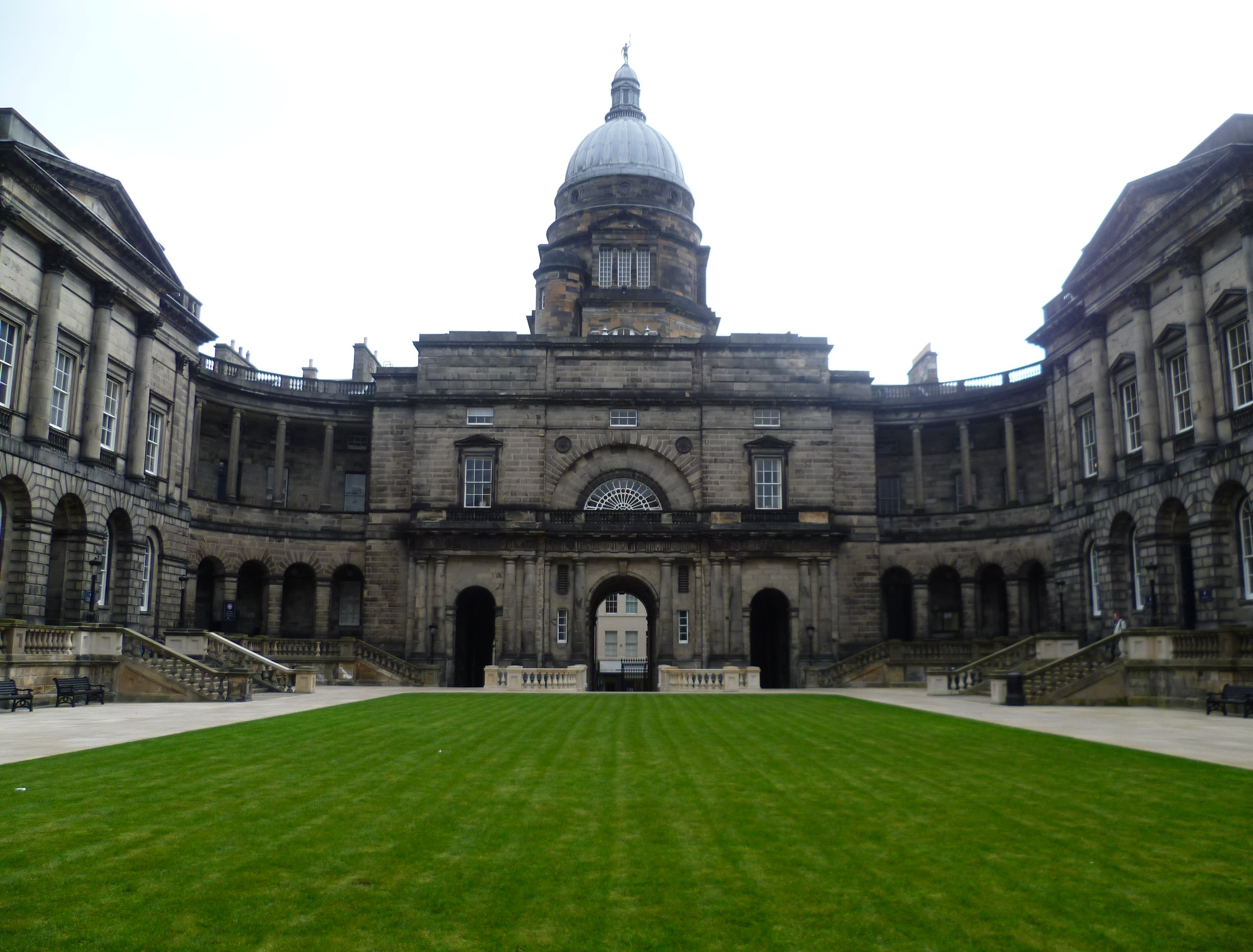
Old College, University of Edinburgh, planned by Robert Adam and completed in the nineteenth century

In the eighteenth century the universities went from being small and parochial institutions, largely for the training of clergy and lawyers, to major intellectual centres at the forefront of Scottish identity and life, seen as fundamental to democratic principles and the opportunity for social advancement for the talented. Chairs of medicine were founded at all the university towns. By the 1740s Edinburgh medical school was the major centre of medicine in Europe and was a leading centre in the Atlantic world. Access to Scottish universities was probably more open than in contemporary England, Germany or France. Attendance was less expensive and the student body more representative of society as a whole. The system was flexible and the curriculum became a modern philosophical and scientific one, in keeping with contemporary needs for improvement and progress. Scotland reaped the intellectual benefits of this system in its contribution to the European Enlightenment. Many of the key figures of the Scottish Enlightenment were university professors, who developed their ideas in university lectures. Key figures included Francis Hutcheson, Hugh Blair, David Hume, Adam Smith, James Burnett, Adam Ferguson, John Millar and William Robertson, William Cullen, James Anderson, Joseph Black and James Hutton.

=== Modern era ===
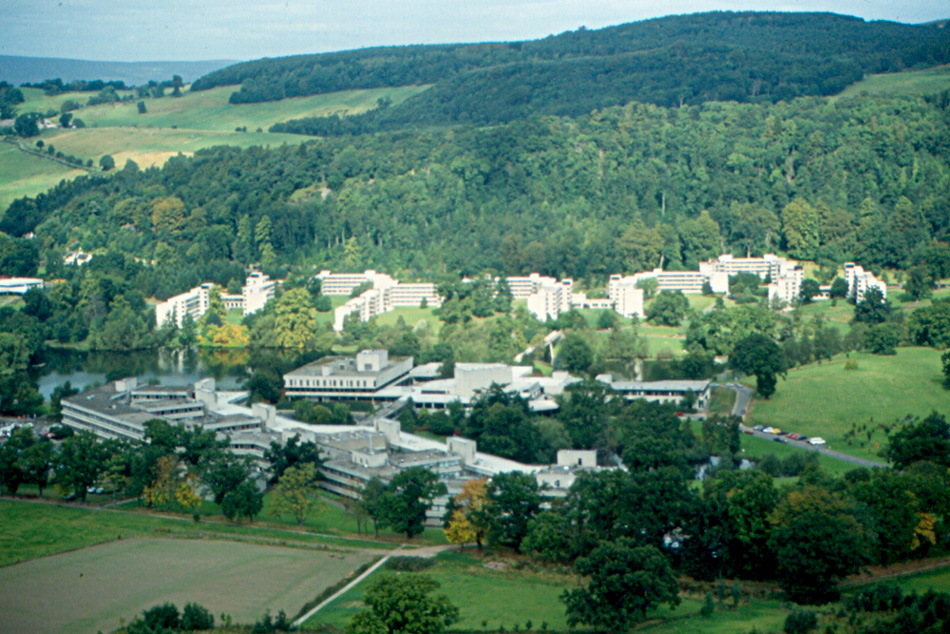
The purpose-built modern buildings of the University of Stirling

At the beginning of the nineteenth century, Scotland's five university colleges had no entrance exam, students typically entered at ages of 15 or 16, attended for as little as two years, chose which lectures to attend and left without qualifications. The curriculum was dominated by divinity and the law and there was a concerted attempt to modernise the curriculum, particularly by introducing degrees in the physical sciences and the need to reform the system to meet the needs of the emerging middle classes and the professions. The result of these reforms was a revitalisation of the Scottish university system, which expanded to 6,254 students by the end of the century and produced leading figures in both the arts and sciences. In the first half of the twentieth century Scottish universities fell behind those in England and Europe in terms of participation and investment. After the Robbins Report of 1963 there was a rapid expansion in higher education in Scotland. By the end of the decade the number of Scottish Universities had doubled. New universities included the University of Dundee, Strathclyde, Heriot-Watt, and Stirling. From the 1970s the government preferred to expand higher education in the non-university sector and by the late 1980s roughly half of students in higher education were in colleges. In 1992, under the Further and Higher Education Act 1992, the distinction between universities and colleges was removed, creating new universities at Abertay, Glasgow Caledonian, Napier, Paisley and Robert Gordon.

== Present ==
=== Organisation ===
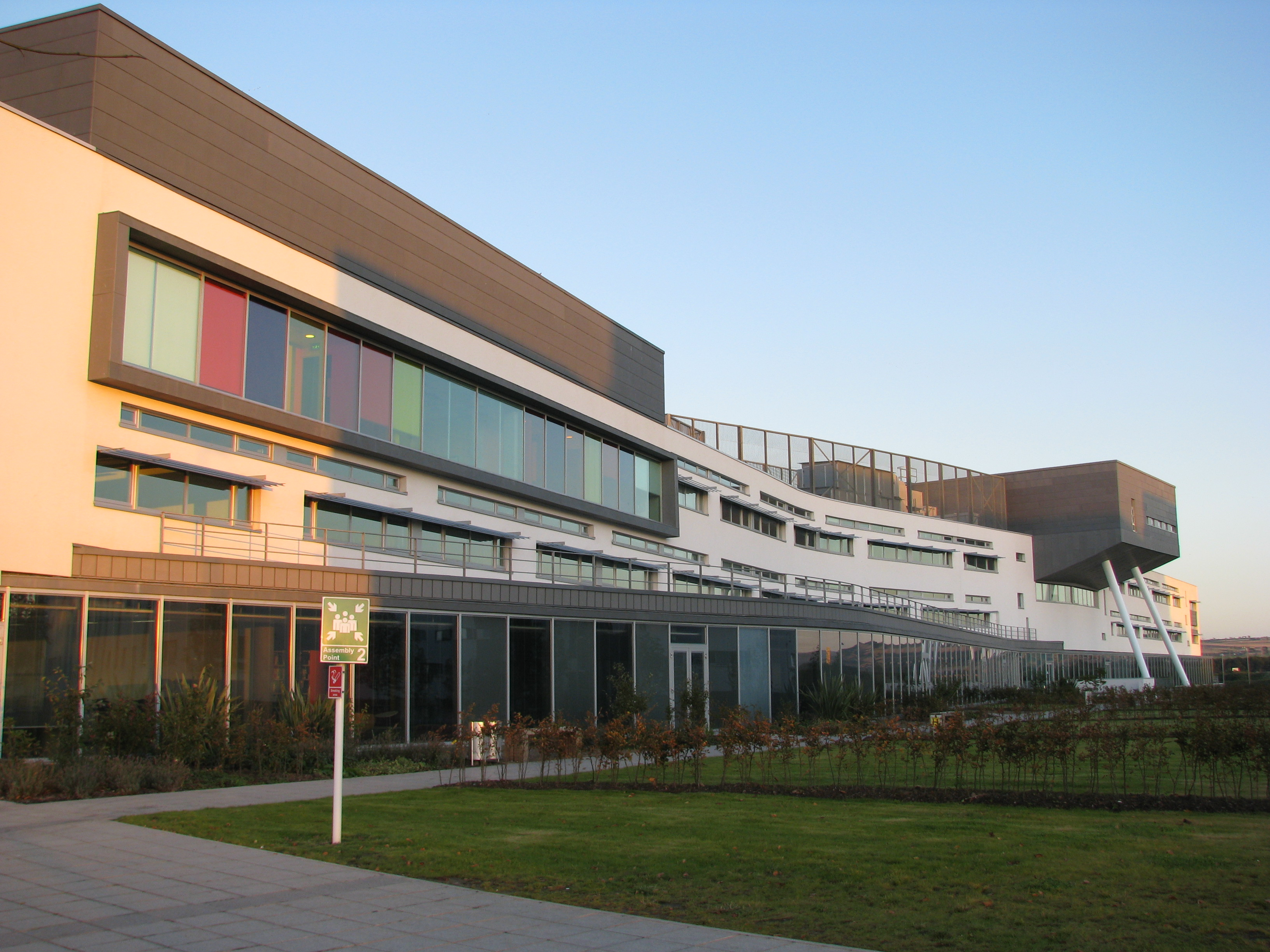
The Main Building of Queen Margaret University

There are fifteen universities in Scotland and three other institutions of higher education which have the authority to award academic degrees. The University of the Highlands and Islands (UHI) gained full university status in 2011, having been created through the federation of 13 colleges and research institutions across the Highlands and Islands, a process that began in 2001.

All Scottish universities have the power to award degrees at all levels: undergraduate, taught postgraduate, and doctoral. Education in Scotland is controlled by the Scottish Government under the terms of the Scotland Act 1998. The minister responsible for higher education is the Cabinet Secretary for Education and Skills, currently Jenny Gilruth of the Scottish National Party. University status in Scotland and throughout the United Kingdom today is conferred by the Privy Council which takes advice from the Quality Assurance Agency for Higher Education.

=== Funding and finances ===
All Scottish universities are public universities and part funded by the Scottish Government (through its Scottish Funding Council) and financial support is provided for Scottish-domiciled students by the Student Awards Agency for Scotland. Students ordinarily resident in Scotland do not pay tuition fees for their first undergraduate degree, but tuition fees are charged for those from the rest of the United Kingdom. All students are required to pay tuition fees for postgraduate education (e.g. MSc, PhD), except in certain priority areas funded by the Scottish Government, or if another source of funding can be found (e.g. research council studentship for a PhD). A representative body called Universities Scotland works to promote Scotland's universities, as well as six other higher education institutions.

The total consolidated annual income for the fifteen Scottish universities for 2020–2021 was £4.38 billion of which £847 million was from research grants and contracts, with an operating surplus of £290.4 million (6.63%). £1.36 billion was received from the Scottish Funding Council via grants and £298.5 million was received from tuition fees of Home-domiciled students, defined as Scotland-domiciled students and European Union-domiciled students who began their studies prior to 2021–2022. The table below is a record of each Scottish university's financial data for the 2020–2021 financial year as recorded by the Higher Education Statistics Agency:

University	Government funding body grants (£M)	Funding Body income as % of total income	Home-Domiciled Teaching income (£M)	Overall Teaching income (£M)	Teaching income as % of total income	Research income (£M)	Research income as % of total income	Total income (£M)	Operating surplus (£M)	Surplus as % of total income
University of Aberdeen	87.6	37.1%	16.6	74.4	31.5%	45.9	19.5%	235.9	7.0	2.96%
Abertay University	21.6	58.0%	6.1	10.4	28.0%	2.9	7.7%	37.2	−0.9	−2.49%
University of Dundee	93.4	33.8%	17.9	73.9	26.8%	74.4	26.9%	276.2	6.7	2.42%
University of Edinburgh	236.3	19.9%	41.4	435.0	36.6%	324.0	27.3%	1,187.4	127.3	10.72%
Edinburgh Napier University	66.3	50.6%	14.7	51.8	39.5%	3.7	2.8%	131.1	−2.7	−2.05%
University of Glasgow	198.4	24.4%	42.5	292.8	36.0%	173.3	21.3%	813.1	117.3	14.42%
Glasgow Caledonian University	73.8	54.9%	26.3	47.0	34.9%	5.4	4.0%	134.6	−2.1	−1.59
Heriot-Watt University	50.0	21.1%	17.6	128.1	54.5%	32.9	14.0%	235.1	2.2	0.94%
Queen Margaret University	20.7	47.0%	6.6	15.1	34.2%	3.0	6.8%	44.0	−1.9	−4.2%
Robert Gordon University	51.9	50.3%	18.5	40.3	39.0%	3.0	2.9%	103.2	−2.5	−2.45%
University of St Andrews	48.2	16.6%	7.0	121.9	42.0%	43.7	15.0%	290.4	40.5	13.95%
University of Stirling	53.7	43.1%	15.7	43.5	34.9%	13.3	10.7%	124.5	11.6	9.28%
University of Strathclyde	114.3	32.9%	37.2	103.3	29.7%	88.0	25.3%	347.4	−9.6	−2.75%
University of the Highlands and Islands	110.2	74.0%	10.2	12.0	8.1%	14.5	9.7%	148.9	−4.1	−2.72%
University of the West of Scotland	77.3	60.2%	20.3	43.1	33.5%	4.8	3.7%	128.5	1.6	1.27%

=== Students ===
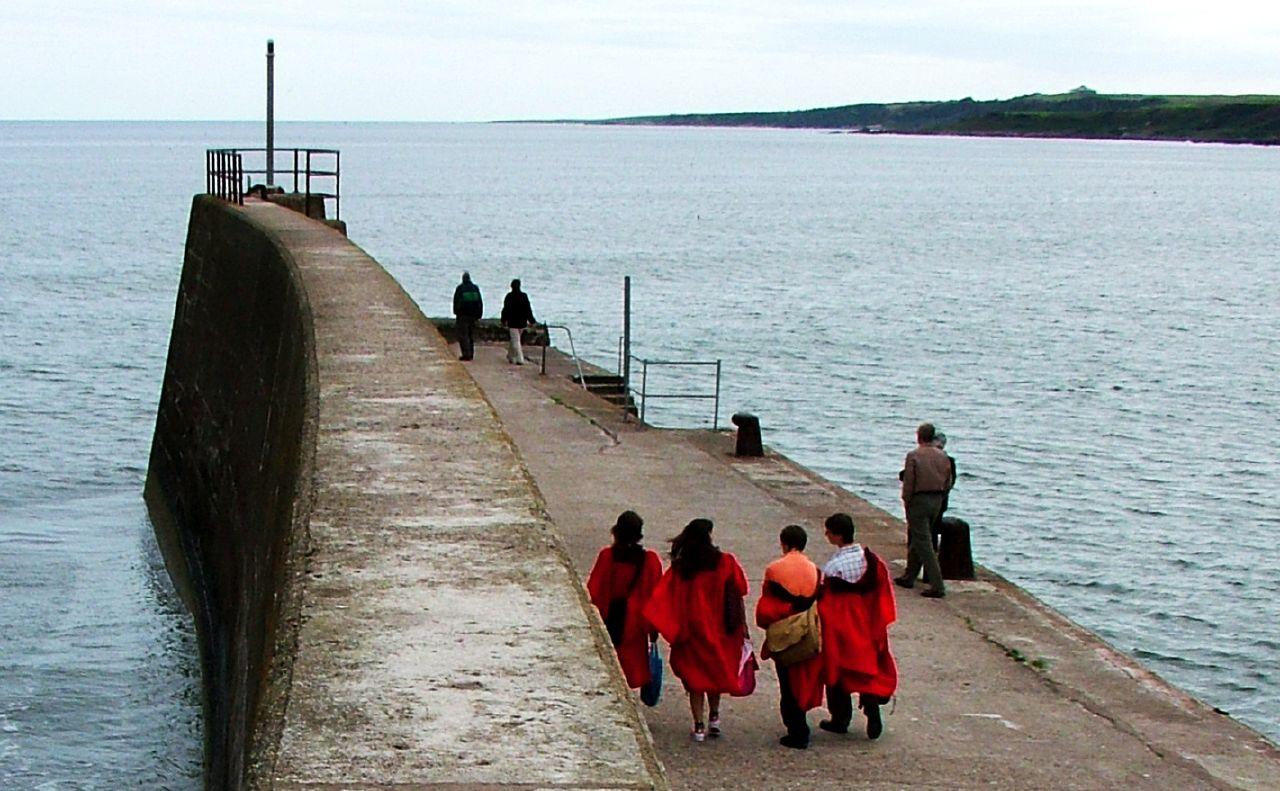
St Andrews students in undergraduate gowns

In the 2022–23 academic year, 292,240 students studied at universities or institutes of higher education in Scotland, 228,005 of whom were full-time, 59.0% were female and 40.4% male. 59.5% of students were domiciled in Scotland, 11.5% from the rest of the United Kingdom, and the remaining 28.7% being international students (4.5% from the European Union). Of all these, approximately 198,745 were studying at undergraduate level, 79,395 for a taught postgraduate degree (primarily a master's degree) and 14,105 for a postgraduate research degree (primarily PhD). The three largest universities by enrolment were the Universities of Glasgow (39,755 students), Edinburgh (39,110 students) and Strathclyde (24,860 students).

=== Scottish Universities Summer Schools in Physics ===
The Scottish Universities Summer School in Physics (SUSSP) was established in 1960 by the four ancient Scottish Universities (Aberdeen, Edinburgh, Glasgow and St. Andrews) to contribute to the dissemination of advanced knowledge in physics and the formation of contacts among scientists from different countries through the setting up of a series of annual summer schools of the highest international standard. As of 2014 it had increased to include Dundee, Glasgow Caledonian, Heriot-Watt, Paisley, and Strathclyde.

=== Rankings ===
In the 2026 national league table rankings, six of the top thirty in both of The Guardian University Guide and in The Times/Sunday Times Good University Guide were Scottish universities. In the 2026 global rankings, three Scottish universities featured in the world's top 200 universities in both of the QS and the Times Higher Education World University Rankings.

University	Complete 2027 (National)	Guardian 2026 (National)	Times/Sunday Times 2026 (National)	ARWU 2025 (Global)	QS 2027 (Global)	THE 2026 (Global)
University of Aberdeen	32	18	23=	201–300	288	201–250
Abertay University	105	50	62	—	—	—
University of Dundee	25	26	23=	401–500	447=	301–350
University of Edinburgh	19	13	25	37	35	29
Edinburgh Napier University	81=	94	51	—	801–850	601–800
University of Glasgow	29	24	22	101–150	80	84
Glasgow Caledonian University	89	104	36	—	1001–1200	801–1000
Heriot-Watt University	31	31	39	701–800	325	401–500
Queen Margaret University	102=	96	66	—	1201–1400	—
Robert Gordon University	75	92	50	—	1001–1200	801–1000
University of St Andrews	4	2	2	301–400	115=	162=
University of Stirling	55	103	55	701–800	560=	501–600
University of Strathclyde	39	19	11	701–800	230=	351–400
University of the West of Scotland	128	123	110	—	—	601–800

In terms of rankings there are four distinctive clusters of higher and lower status universities in the UK: Oxbridge comprising cluster one; a second cluster containing the remaining 22 Russell Group universities together with 17 other old universities, including Aberdeen, Dundee, Edinburgh, Glasgow, Heriot-Watt, St Andrews, Stirling and Strathclyde; a third cluster containing 13 old universities and 54 new universities including the remaining Scottish universities; and a fourth cluster contains 19 new universities but no Scottish universities.

=== Research Excellence Framework ===
The below lists the outcome of the latest Research Excellence Framework undertaken in 2021 (the next REF is scheduled for 2028) by the four UK higher education funding bodies. The quality of research was rated 4* (world leading), 3* (internationally excellent), 2* (recognised internationally), 1* (recognised nationally) and unclassified. GPA measures the quality of research and Research Power is calculated by the GPA score of a university multiplied by the full-time equivalent number of researchers submitted. The rankings are out of 129 institutions as measured by output:

	Quality profile %						
University	4*	3*	2*	1*	Unclassified	GPA ranking	Research Power ranking
University of Aberdeen	29	51	19	1	0	53	37
Abertay University	12	52	31	4	0	97	108
University of Dundee	38	45	16	1	0	41	49
University of Edinburgh	41	45	12	1	0	19	4
Edinburgh Napier University	19	52	27	2	0	77	83
University of Glasgow	48	43	8	0	0	6	13
Glasgow Caledonian University	22	53	22	3	0	66	91
Heriot-Watt University	35	53	10	1	0	33	51
Queen Margaret University	14	37	40	8	2	116	116
Robert Gordon University	12	57	28	3	0	87	113
University of St Andrews	41	46	12	1	0	17	36
University of Stirling	27	51	21	1	0	58	53
University of Strathclyde	31	56	13	1	0	47	32
University of the Highlands and Islands	26	42	27	5	0	77	106
University of West of Scotland	12	46	32	9	1	114	85

== See also ==
- List of universities in Scotland
- List of universities in the United Kingdom
- Student wings of political parties in Scotland
- Universities in the United Kingdom
