= Vargic =

Vargic is a surname. Notable people with the surname include:

- Ivan Vargić (born 1987), Croatian footballer
- Martin Vargic (born 1998), Slovak artist
