= Steve Anderson (author) =

American author and translator

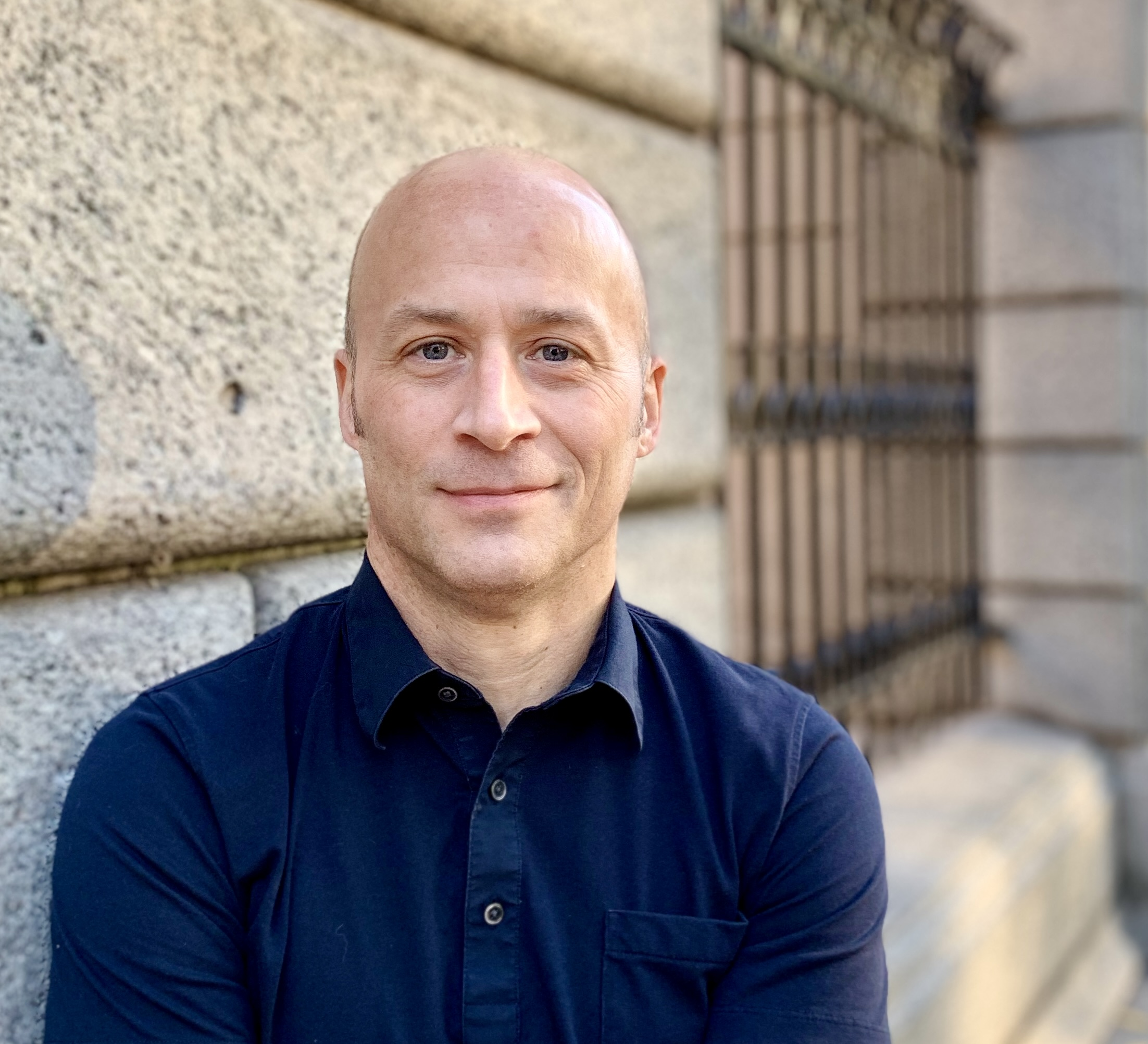
- Anderson in 2018
- Born: Stephen F. Anderson; 1966 (age 59–60); Southeast Portland, Oregon, U.S.
- Education: Portland State University (MA)
- Occupations: Writer, translator, editor
- Writing career
- Language: English
- Genres: Historical thrillers, crime fiction
- Website: stephenfanderson.com

Stephen F. Anderson (born 1966) is an American writer, freelance editor and translator of German fiction. He is best known for his historical thrillers in the Kaspar Brothers series and his work in crime fiction.

== Early life and education ==
Anderson was born in 1966 in Southeast Portland, Oregon. He was adopted at birth by a couple who lived through World War II, he attributes his intrigue with Germanic influences to his adoptive mother.

He earned a Master of Arts in History from Portland State University and initially planned to become a history professor. However, while later serving as a Fulbright Fellow in Munich, Germany, he became interested in writing fiction.

Anderson worked in several fields, including advertising, marketing, and journalism with the Associated Press, as well as holding positions as a waiter, an Associated Press rookie, and a language instructor. He is an amateur beach soccer player, and participated in the Philippine National Beach Football Championship in 2000 and 2002. He is a soccer fan and follows Portland Timbers. He currently lives in Portland, Oregon, with his wife, René.

== Career ==
=== Writing and screenwriting ===
Anderson began his career as a screenwriter. His works received multiple nominations, including being a Quarterfinalist for the 2009 Nicholl Fellowships in Screenwriting for False Flags.

In 2010, Anderson self-published his first novel, The Losing Role, which was the first of the Kaspar Brothers historical thriller series. He has since published several novels, short stories, and non-fiction books. His fiction output consists primarily of historical thrillers and crime fiction, including his other series, the Wendell Lett books.

=== Translation ===
Anderson is also a freelance editor and translator of German fiction.

His translation work has earned recognition, including a long-list nomination for the Gold Dagger Award for Crime Fiction in Translation in 2022.

In 2015, Anderson took part in TransLab for emerging translators of German to English, a collaboration between the German Book Office NY and the Goethe-Institut NY. In 2018, he held a residency at the Europäisches Übersetzer-Kollegium in Straelen, Germany with a stipend award from the Kunststiftung NRW.

== Bibliography ==
=== Fiction ===
==== Kaspar Brothers series ====
1. The Losing Role (2010)
2. Liberated (2014)
3. Lost Kin (2016)
4. Lines of Deception (2024)

==== Wendell Lett series ====
1. Under False Flags (2014)
2. The Preserve (2019)

==== Standalones ====
1. The Other Oregon: A Thriller (2015)
2. Rain Down: A Crime Novella (2016)
3. Show Game (2024)

=== Non-Fiction ===
1. Sitting Ducks (2011)
2. Double-Edged Sword (2012)

=== Screenplays ===
1. Debts (2002)
2. False Flags (2009)
3. Trickle Down (2009)
4. The Other Oregon (2010)

== Awards and competitions ==
Year	Level	Competition	Work
2002	Semifinalist	Chesterfield Writer's Film Project	Debts
2002	Semifinalist	Writer's Network Screenplay Competition	Debts
2008	Semifinalist	Fade In Awards	Debts
2009	Quarterfinalist	Nicholl Fellowships in Screenwriting	False Flags
2009	Quarterfinalist	Creative World Awards	False Flags
2010	Quarterfinalist	Creative World Awards	The Other Oregon
2010	Quarterfinalist	Champion Screenwriting Competition	The Other Oregon
2010	Semifinalist	Gimme Credit International Screenplay Competition	The Other Oregon
2010	Top 30 Semifinalist	Movie Script Contest	The Other Oregon
2010	Finalist	Santa Fe Writers Project Screenplay Awards	The Other Oregon
2010	Finalist	3rd Screenplay Search Screenwriting Competition	The Other Oregon
2022	Long-listed	Crime Writers’ Association Dagger Award for Crime Fiction in Translation	Seat 7a (translation)
