= Sharat Kumar =

Indian writer (born 1937)

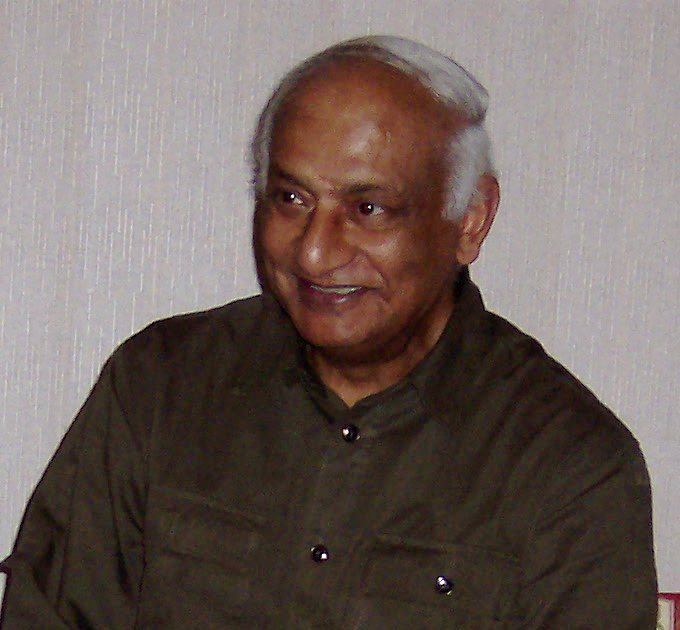
Sharat Kumar, March 2006

Sharat Kumar (born 29 July 1937 in Meerut, India) is an Indian writer of both fiction and nonfiction. He is best known for his novels Orange Moon (2002, English edition) and Lal Kothi Alvida ("Farewell Red Mansion") (2004, Hindi, 2009, English).

== Filmography ==
- Duvidha (2008)

== Sources ==
- Salam, Ziya Us (9 January 2003). "A new dawn with 'Orange Moon'". The Hindu. Archived from the original on 12 February 2003.
- Narayan, Ranjana (4 March 2004). "No 'Alvida' to old values". The Hindu. Archived from the original on 1 July 2004.
- "Telly Buzz". Screen Weekly. 6 January 2006. Archived from the original on 1 July 2004.
