= Arts and Letters (disambiguation) =

Arts and letters may refer to:

- Arts and letters, the literary arts ("letters") together with the fine arts and/or the performing arts
- Arts and Letters, an American thoroughbred race horse
- Arts & Letters, a literary journal based at Georgia College
- Arts & Letters Daily, a web portal owned by The Chronicle of Higher Education

== See also ==
- American Academy of Arts and Letters
- College of Arts and Sciences, sometimes referred to as a College of Arts and Letters
- Ordre des Arts et des Lettres, a French honour given for contributions to the arts and/or literature
- Belles-lettres, literature valued for its aesthetic qualities
