= Belles-lettres =

Art writing or miscellaneous fiction

Belles-lettres (French pronunciation: [bɛl lɛtʁ]) is a category of writing, originally meaning beautiful or fine writing. In the modern narrow sense, it is a label for literary works that do not fall into the major categories such as fiction, poetry, or drama. The phrase is sometimes used pejoratively for writing that focuses on the aesthetic qualities of language rather than its practical application. A writer of belles-lettres is a belletrist.

== Overview ==
Literally, belles-lettres is a French phrase meaning 'beautiful' or 'fine' writing. In this sense, therefore, it includes all literary works—especially fiction, poetry, drama, or essays—valued for their aesthetic qualities and originality of style and tone. The term thus can be used to refer to literature generally. The Nuttall Encyclopedia, for example, described belles-lettres as the "department of literature which implies literary culture and belongs to the domain of art, whatever the subject may be or the special form; it includes poetry, the drama, fiction, and criticism," while the Encyclopædia Britannica Eleventh Edition describes it as "the more artistic and imaginative forms of literature, as poetry or romance, as opposed to more pedestrian and exact studies."

However, for many modern purposes, belles-lettres is used in a narrower sense to identify literary works that do not fall into other major categories, such as fiction, poetry or drama. Thus, it would include essays, récits, published collections of speeches and letters, satirical and humorous writings, and other miscellaneous works. The Oxford English Dictionary (2nd edition) says that "it is now generally applied (when used at all) to the lighter branches of literature". The term remains in use among librarians and others who have to classify books: while a large library might have separate categories for essays, letters, humor and so forth (and most of them are assigned different codes in, for example, the Dewey decimal classification system), in libraries of modest size they are often all grouped together under the heading "belles-lettres".

The phrase is sometimes used in a derogatory manner when speaking about the study of literature: those who study rhetoric often deride many language departments (particularly English departments in the English-speaking world) for focusing on the aesthetic qualities of language rather than its practical application. A quote from Brian Sutton's article in Language and Learning Across the Disciplines, "Writing in the Disciplines, First-Year Composition, and the Research Paper", serves to illustrate the rhetoricians' opinion on this subject and their use of the term:

Writing-in-the-disciplines adherents, well aware of the wide range of academic genres a first-year composition student may have to deal with in the future, are unlikely to force those students to venture so deeply into any one genre as to require slavish imitation. The only first-year composition teachers likely to demand "conformity and submission" to a particular kind of academic discourse are those English-department fixtures, the evangelical disciples of literature, professors whose goal in first-year composition is to teach students to explicate belles lettres. Writing-in-the-disciplines adherents, unlike teachers of literature-as-composition, generally recognize the folly of forcing students to conform to the conventions of a discourse community they have no desire to join.

In his Elements of Criticism, prominent Scottish belles-lettres rhetorician Lord Kames (1696–1782) says the aim of the belles-lettres movement is to "discover a foundation for reasoning upon the taste of an individual" and "design a science of rational criticism." Samuel Taylor Coleridge criticizes the term as being of less than reputable origin. The focus of the Belletristic Rhetoric Theory is on defining the characteristics of rhetorical style such as beauty, sublimity, propriety and wit all of which play a part in affecting the emotion and reasoning capabilities of the audience. Also important to those studying rhetoric and belles-lettres is defining the taste of the audience; this is key to being a truly successful rhetorician or writer. As another belles-lettres rhetorician, Hugh Blair (1718–1800), states in Lectures on Rhetoric and Belles Lettres, "taste is foundational to rhetoric and necessary for successful spoken and written discourse."

== See also ==
- Académie des Inscriptions et Belles-Lettres
- Arts and letters (disambiguation)
- Literary fiction
