= Martin Vargic =

Slovak artist and author (born 1998)

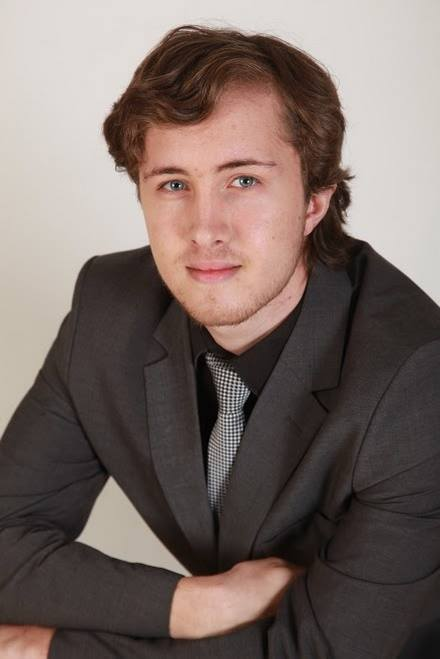
- Self-portrait photograph
- Born: Martin Vargic; 10 March 1998 (age 28) Banská Bystrica, Slovakia
- Areas: Cartography; Digital art
- Notable works: Vargic's Miscellany of Curious Maps, Map of the Internet, Map of Stereotypes, The World - Climate Change

Martin Vargic is a Slovak artist and author, known for his book "Vargic's Miscellany of Curious Maps", and "Map of the Internet".

== Maps ==
Vargic publishes all of his works (chiefly maps and charts) on his website, halcyonmaps.com.

On 15 January 2014, Vargic published the "Map of the Internet" on DeviantArt. It is a conceptual artwork that depicts the largest websites and software companies as sovereign nations on a stylized political map of the world, scaled according to their traffic and Alexa ratings. It was first featured in media on 30 January 2014, after a design and technology blog Gizmodo wrote an article on the subject.

Following week, the map was featured on a wide variety of news sites and blogs in over 20 countries, most notably on The Independent, Fox News, The Huffington Post and Business Insider.

In addition to the "Map of the Internet", Vargic has recently published a wide variety of other maps, notably "The World - Climate Change", depicting the world after 260-ft sea level rise, the "Map of Stereotypes" and a number of other maps and charts.

In September 2015, Vargic published his first book, Vargic's Miscellany of Curious Maps.
