= St John's College, St Andrews =

St John's College (or Auld pedagogy) of the University of St Andrews as a constituent college founded between 1418 and 1430 and was the precursor to present-day St Mary's College. The founder of the college was Lawrence of Lindores (1372–1437) under the chancellorship of Bishop Wardlaw.

== History ==
King James I used the rivalry between Bishop-Chancellor Wardlaw and Lawrence, to petition the Pope, in 1426, to transfer the University from St Andrews to Perth, in line with the King's policy of bringing the Scottish Church under royal control. This move failed, but it made the academic community aware of its common interests.

The college was located on South Street, on the present site of the King James library and Parliament Hall, to the immediate east of the present St Marys College buildings. Parts of the original college buildings were incorporated into the King James library and adjoining structures in the nineteenth century.

St John's College was refounded by Cardinal David Beaton under the name the "New College of the Assumption of the Blessed Virgin Mary" or "St Mary's College" in 1538.

St Mary's preserves the link to St John's in its motto, In Principio Erat Verbum, from the gospel of St John, 1.1, English translation 'In the beginning was the word'. The motto can be seen above the entrance gate to the college.

St John's College coat of Arms was the red phoenix of St John the evangelist on a silver background with the motto in principio erat verbum diagonal across the phoenix.
