= Architecture of Scotland in the Industrial Revolution =

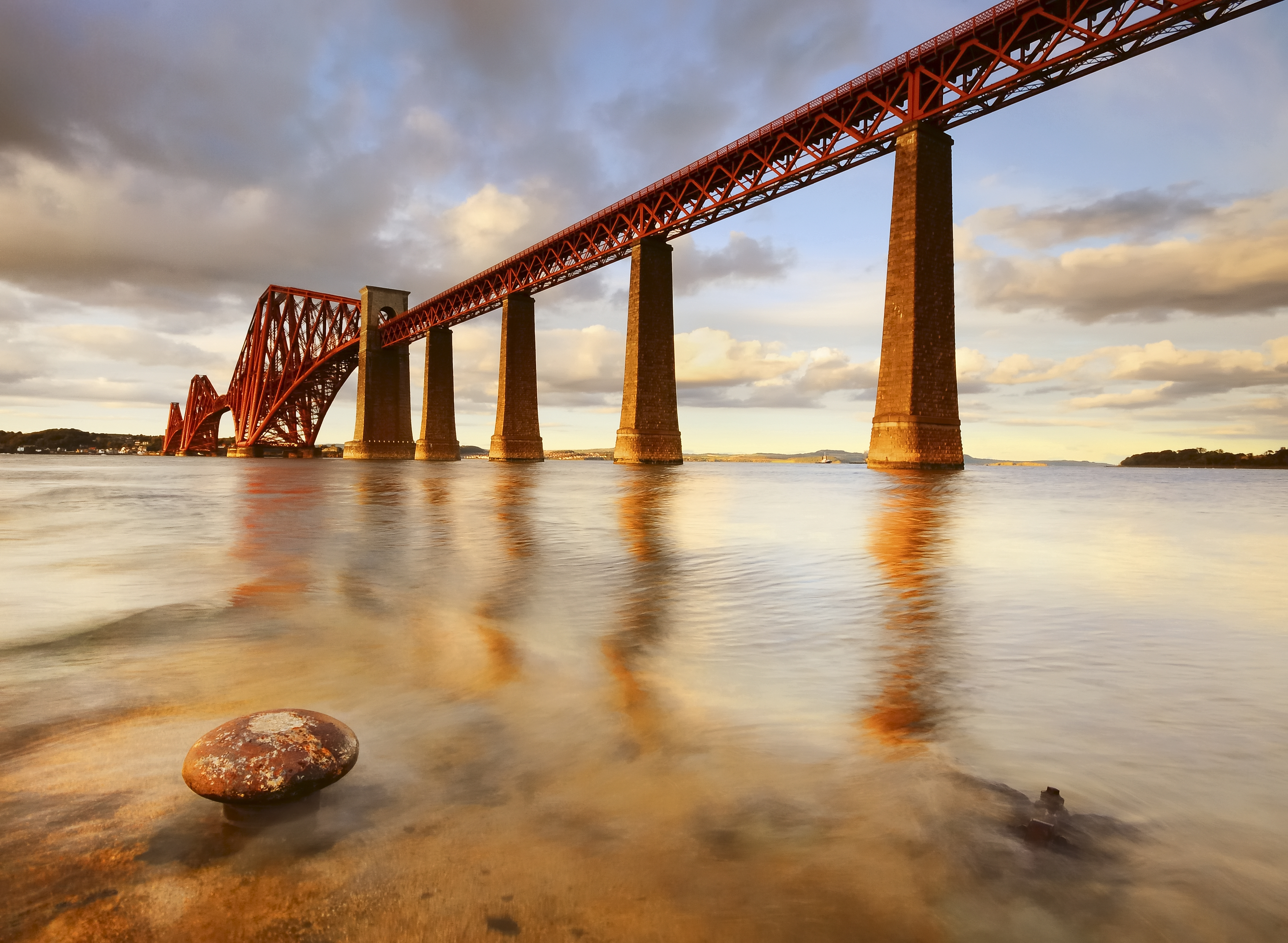
The iconic Forth Bridge, the first major structure in Britain to be constructed of steel

Architecture of Scotland in the Industrial Revolution includes all building in Scotland between the mid-eighteenth century and the end of the nineteenth century. During this period, the country underwent an economic and social transformation as a result of industrialisation, which was reflected in new architectural forms, techniques and scale of building. In the second half of the eighteenth century, Edinburgh was the focus of a classically inspired building boom that reflected the growing wealth and confidence of the capital. Housing often took the form of horizontally divided tenement flats. Some of the leading European architects during this period were Scottish, including Robert Adam and William Chambers.

While urban centres were rebuilt in local materials, including Aberdeen in granite and Glasgow in red sandstone, the homes of the rural poor remained basic, particularly in the Highlands. In the cities they were confined to the sprawl of suburban tenements like those of the Gorbals in Glasgow. One response to growing population was the creation of planned new towns, like those at Inverary and New Lanark. The nineteenth century also was the revival of the Scots Baronial style, pioneered at Walter Scott's Abbotsford House and confirmed in popularity by Queen Victoria's residence at Balmoral Castle. There was also a revival of Gothic styles in church architecture. Neo-classicism continued to be a major movement in the works of architects including William Henry Playfair and Alexander "Greek" Thomson. The later part of the century also saw some of the most important architectural products of new engineering, including the iconic Forth Bridge.

== Late eighteenth century ==
=== Neo-classicism ===
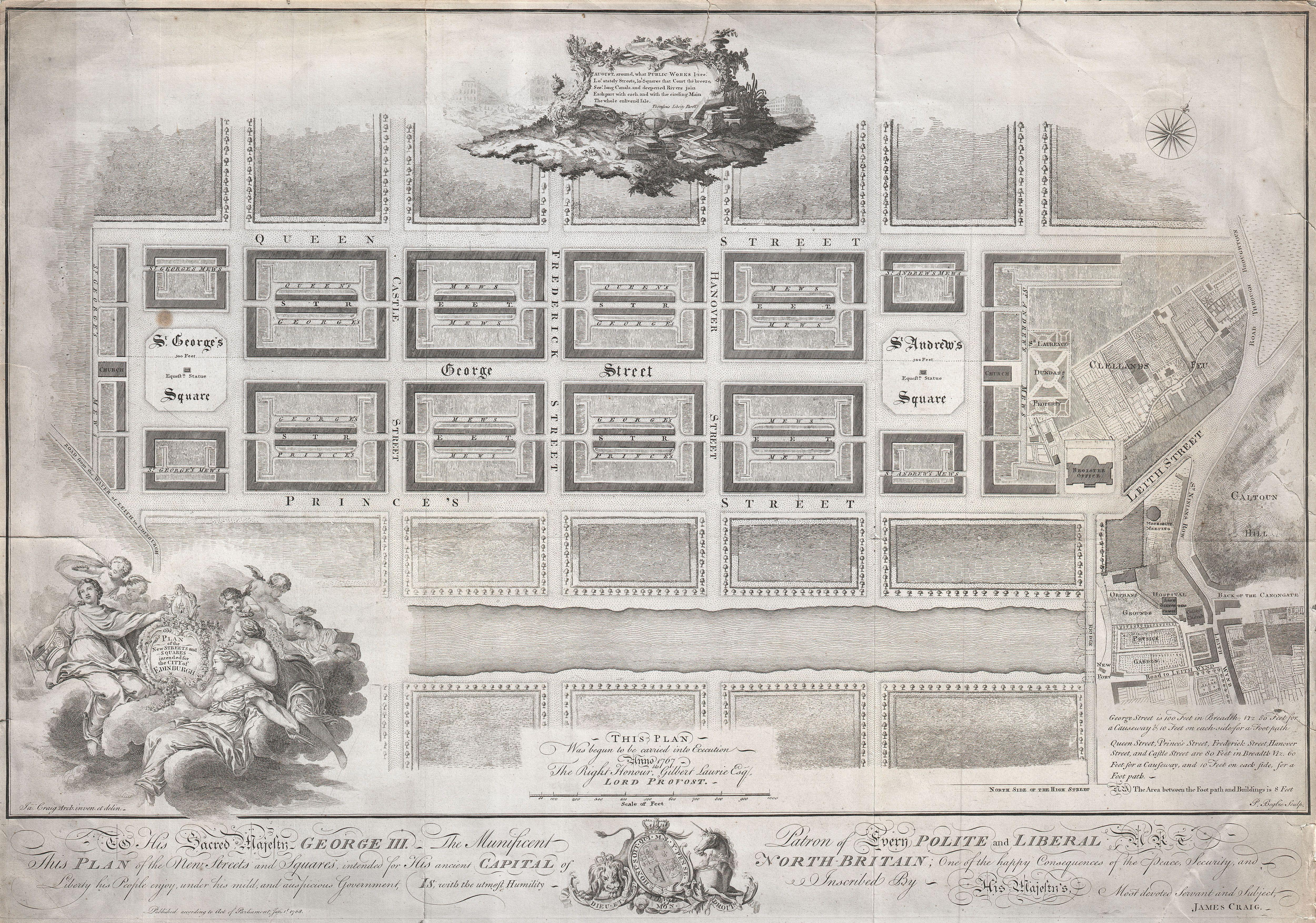
Plan for the New Town, Edinburgh by James Craig (1768)

During the Industrial Revolution, Scotland became one of the commercial and industrial centres of the British Empire. From the mid-eighteenth century this growing wealth and confidence was reflected in a classically inspired building boom focused on Edinburgh's New Town. It was laid out according to a plan of rectangular blocks with open squares, drawn up by James Craig (1739–95) and built in strong Craigleith sandstone which could be precisely cut by masons. Most residences were built as tenement flats, divided horizontally, with different occupants sharing a common staircase, in contrast to the houses used in contemporaneous building in England. The smallest might have only one room; the largest, several bedrooms and drawing rooms. Common features of neo-classical building included columns, temple fronts, rounded arches, flanking wings and domes. This classicism, together with its reputation as a major centre of the Enlightenment, resulted in the city being nicknamed "The Athens of the North". The gridiron plan, building forms and the architectural detailing would be copied by many smaller towns, although rendered in locally quarried materials.

Despite this building boom, the centralisation of much of the government administration, including the king's works, in London, meant that a number of Scottish architects spent most of their careers in England, where they had a major impact on Georgian architecture. Robert Adam (1728–92) emerged as leader of the first phase of the neo-classical revival in England and Scotland from around 1760 until his death. He rejected the elaborate Palladian style that had dominated building as "ponderous" and "disgustful". However, he continued their tradition of drawing inspiration directly from classical antiquity, influenced by his four-year stay in Europe, where he saw the excavations at Pompeii and Herculaneum, which for the first time allowed modern Europeans to see classical buildings first hand, rather than work from literary descriptions. Neo-classicism strived for greater simplicity, often more influenced by Greek rather than Roman models. Adam's major works in Edinburgh included the General Register House (1774–92), the University Building (1789) and Charlotte Square (1791). He also designed 36 country houses in Scotland. An interior designer as well as an architect, together with his brothers John (1721–92) and James (1732–94) developing the Adam style, he influenced the development of architecture, not just in Britain, but in Western Europe, North America and in Russia, where his patterns were taken by Scottish architect Charles Cameron (1745–1812).

Adam's main rival was William Chambers (1723–96), another Scot, but born in Sweden. He did most of his work in London, with a small number of houses in Scotland. He was appointed architectural tutor to the Prince of Wales, later George III, and in 1766, with Robert Adam, as Architect to the King. More international in outlook than Adam, he combined Neo-classicism and Palladian conventions and his influence was mediated through his large number of pupils. The classical influence also reached church architecture. Scots-born architect James Gibbs (1682–1754) introduced a consciously antique style in his rebuilding of St Martin-in-the-Fields, London, with a massive, steepled portico and rectangular, side-aisled plan. Similar patterns in Scotland can be seen at St Andrew's in the Square, Glasgow (1737–59), designed by Allan Dreghorn (1706–64) and built by the master mason Mungo Nasmyth. Gibbs' own design for St. Nicholas West, Aberdeen (1752–55), had the same rectangular plan, with a nave-and-aisles, barrel-vaulted layout with superimposed pedimented front.

== Early nineteenth century ==
=== Vernacular building ===
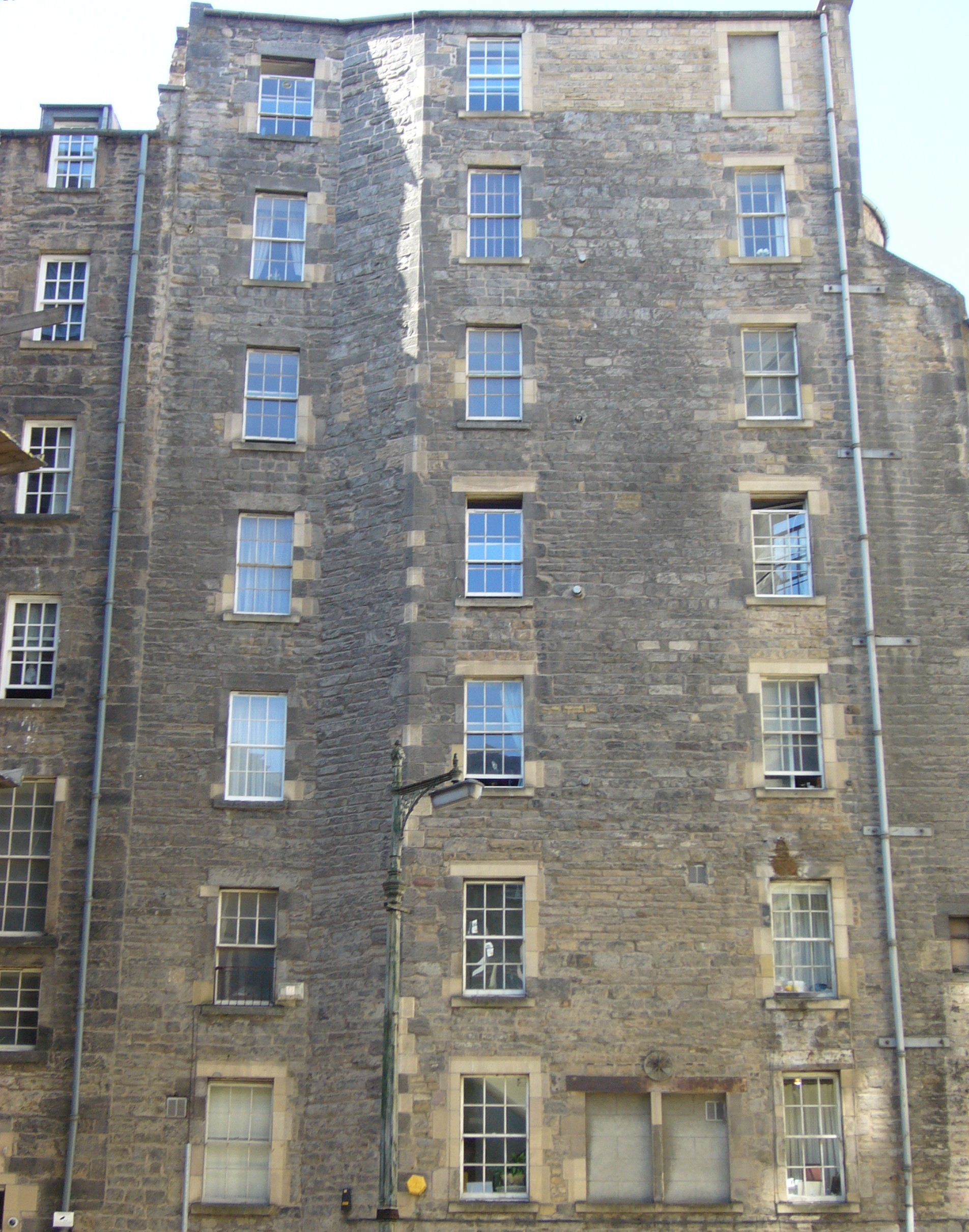
Rear of a nineteenth-century Edinburgh tenement

Vernacular architecture of this period continued to dependent on local materials and styles. Often built by groups of friends and family, the homes of the rural poor were usually of very simple construction. Contemporaries noted that cottages in the Highlands and Islands tended to be cruder, with single rooms, slit windows and earthen floors, often shared by a large family. In contrast many Lowland cottages had distinct rooms and chambers, were clad with plaster or paint and even had glazed windows. In the early 1800s urban settings also included traditional thatched houses, beside the larger, stone and slate roofed town houses of merchants and urban gentry.

The Industrial Revolution transformed the scale of Scottish towns, making Glasgow the "second city of the Empire", growing from a population of 77,385 in 1801 to 274,324 by 1841. Between 1780 and 1830 three middle class "new towns" were laid out on grid-iron plans, similar to those in Edinburgh, to the south and west of the old town. The other side of increasing wealth and planned architecture for the aristocracy and middle classes was the growth of urban sprawl. In Glasgow the growing workforce was left to the mercy of market forces as suburban tenements were thrown up, particularly to the east of the city, like those of the Gorbals to the south, where overcrowding, lack of sanitation and general poverty contributed to disease, crime, and very low life expediency.

Urban centres increasingly made use of locally mined stone. While Edinburgh made extensive use of yellow sandstone, the commercial centre and tenements of Glasgow were built in distinctive red sandstone. After a major fire in the largely wooden Aberdeen in the 1740s, the city fathers decreed that major buildings should be in the locally abundant granite. This began a new phase in large-scale quarrying and led to the "granite city" becoming the centre of a major industry, which supplied Scotland and England with faced stone, pavement slabs and pillars.

=== New towns ===
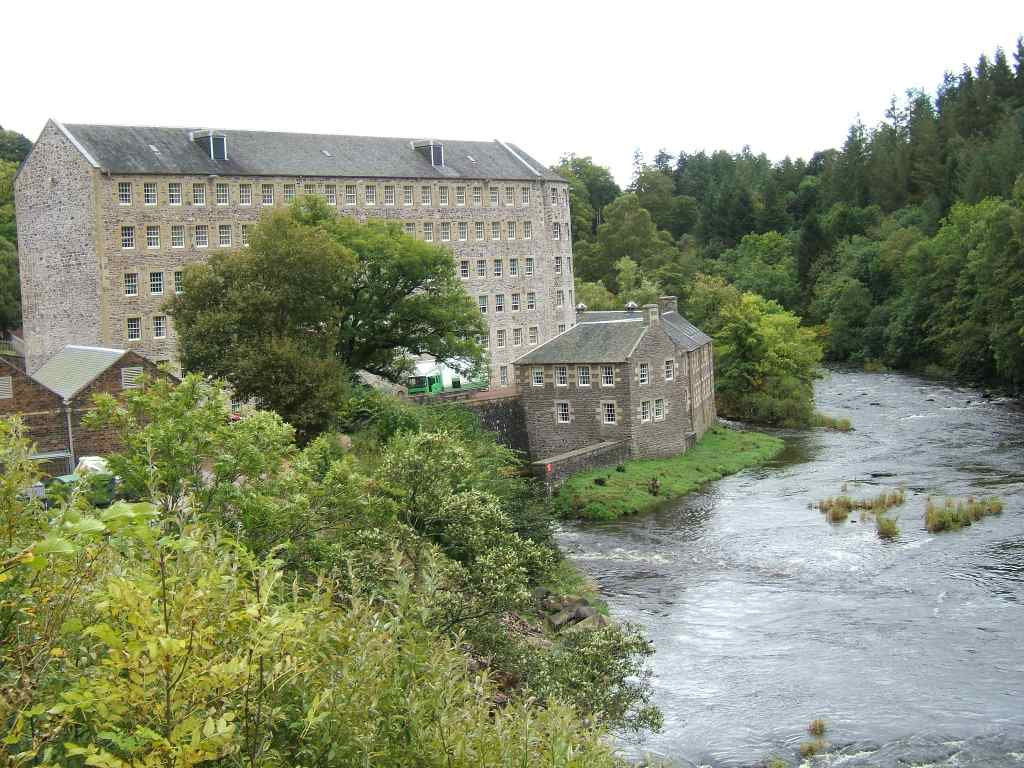
New Lanark, cotton mills and housing for workers, founded in 1786 and developed by Robert Owen from 1800

The sometimes utopian concept of the new town, aimed at improving society through the foundation of architecturally designed communities, was an important part of Scottish thinking from the mid-eighteenth to the twentieth century. In addition to the New Town of Edinburgh these included the complete rebuilding of Inverary for John Campbell, 5th Duke of Argyll by John Adam (1721–92) and Robert Mylne (1733–1811), between 1772 and 1800. Helensburgh near Glasgow was laid out in 1776 on a grid-iron plan. Small new towns on a gridiron plan in the period 1770–1830 included Cuminestown, New Pitsligo, Tomintoul and Aberchirder. At Fochabers, from 1776 John Baxter redesigned the village on a grid plan, with a central square focused on Bellie Church (1795–97), still following in the tradition of Gibbs, with a tetrastyle portico and steeple. From 1800, Robert Owen's New Lanark, designed as a self-contained community, combining industry with ordered and improved living conditions, was an important milestone in the historical development of urban planning. Housing was combined with generous communal and living spaces, a children's school and community education centre. It also introduced a village store that supplied good at lower prices and became the model for the co-operative movement. Scotland also produced one of the major figures in urban planning in sociologist Patrick Geddes (1854–1932), who developed the concept of conurbation, and discarded the idea of "sweeping clearances" to remove existing housing and the imposition of the gridiron plan, in favour of "conservative surgery": retaining the best buildings in an area and removing the worst. He put this into practice in Edinburgh, purchasing and improving slum tenements at James Court, and in new developments at Ramsay Garden.

=== Neo-Classical decline ===
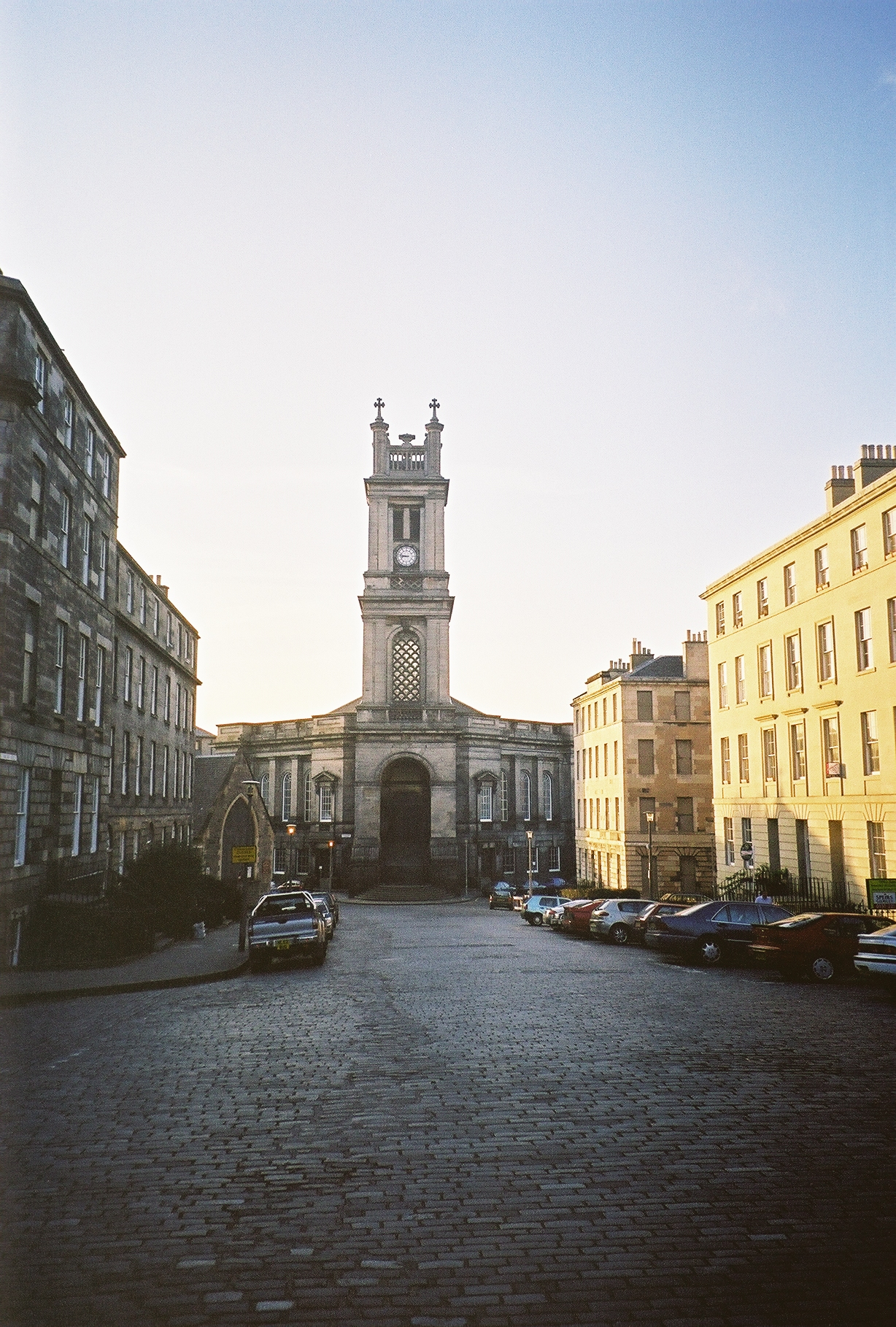
The Gracco-Baroque St Stephen's, Edinburgh

In the early nineteenth century the Gibbs-influenced steepled tradition continued in church architecture, as can be seen in Robert Nisbet's Inveresk Church (1803–10). A Grecian form was developed at William Burn's North Leith Church (1813) and St John's Episcopal Church, Edinburgh (1816). The controversy over the style of the Scottish National Monument in 1816 led to the labelling of Greek temple motifs as "pagan" and relatively few columnar Greek churches were built after that in the capital. An exception was Archibald Elliot's Broughton Church (1820–21), which had a Doric temple front. More common in Edinburgh were churches that combined classical elements with other features, like the domed St George's, Charlotte Square (1811–14), executed by Robert Reid, or the Gracco-Baroque of William Playfair's St Stephen's (1827–28). In Glasgow there was a tradition of grafting porticoes on to existing meeting-houses, which continued in Gillespie Graham's West George Street Independent Church (1818), which was criticised as "popish", and John Baird I's Greyfriars United Secession Church (1821), which was fronted by a Roman Doric portico. Classical designs for the established Church included the redevelopment by William Stark of St George's-Tron Church (1807–08), David Hamilton's (1768–1843) St Enoch's Parish Church (1827) and St Paul's Parish Church (1835).

== Late nineteenth century ==
=== Gothic revival ===
Some of the earliest evidence of a revival in Gothic architecture is from Scotland. Inveraray Castle, constructed from 1746 with design input from William Adam, displays the incorporation of turrets. These were largely conventional Palladian style houses that incorporated some external features of the Scots Baronial style. Robert Adam's houses in this style include Mellerstain and Wedderburn in Berwickshire and Seton House in East Lothian, but it is most clearly seen at Culzean Castle, Ayrshire, remodelled by Adam from 1777. Common features borrowed from sixteenth- and seventeenth-century houses included battlemented gateways, crow-stepped gables, pointed turrets and machicolations.

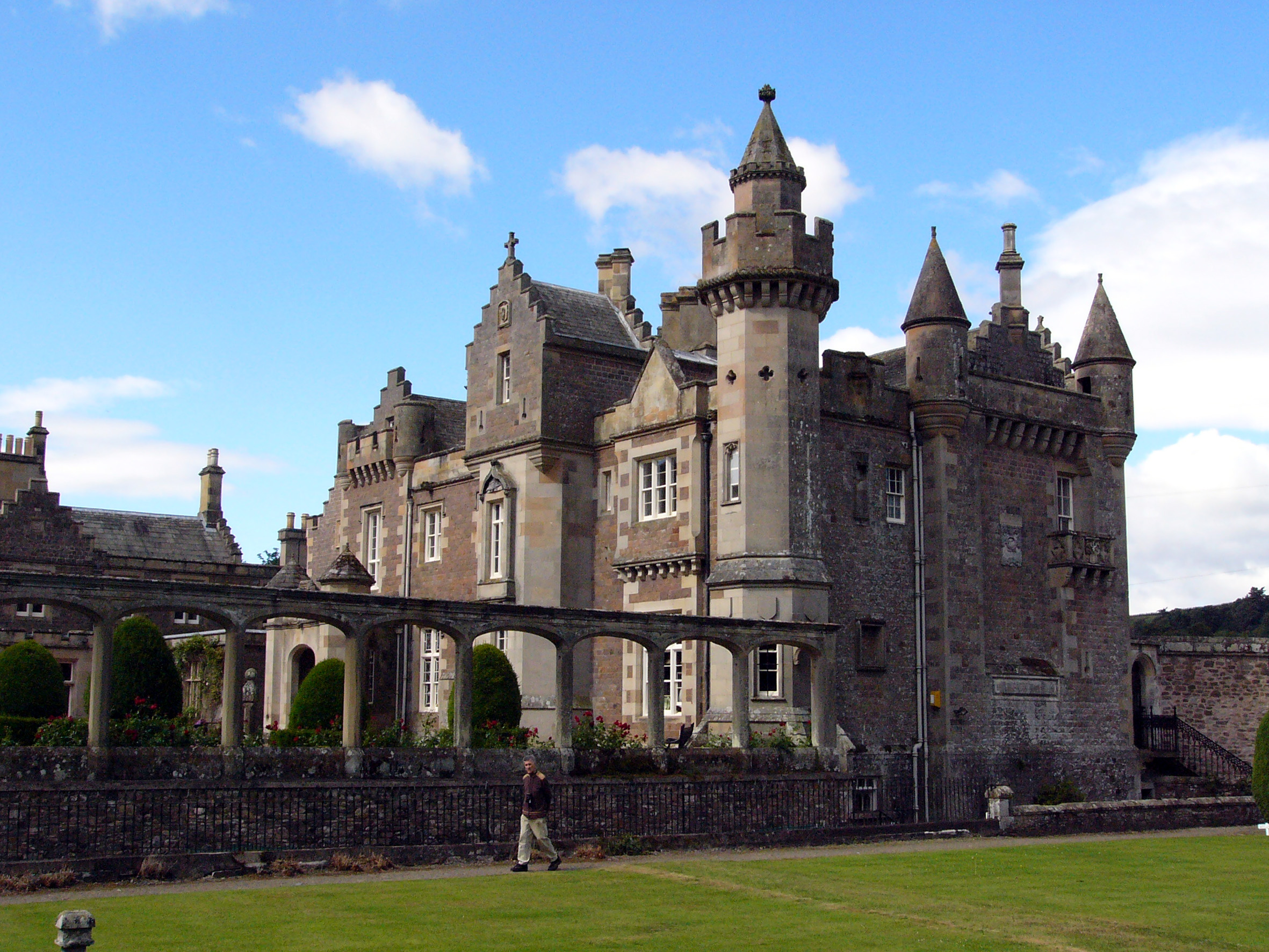
Abbotsford House, re-built for Walter Scott, helping to launch the Scots Baronial revival.

Important for the adoption of the style in the early nineteenth century was Abbotsford House, the residence the novelist and poet, Sir Walter Scott. Rebuilt for him from 1816, it became a model for the modern revival of the Baronial style. Edward Blore (1787–1879), Edward Calvert (c. 1847–1914) and Robert Stodart Lorimer (1864–1929) and in urban contexts, including the building of Cockburn Street in Edinburgh (from the 1850s) as well as the National Wallace Monument at Stirling (1859–69). Important for the dissemination of the style was Robert Billings' (1813–74) multi-volume Baronial and Ecclesiastical Antiquities of Scotland (1848–52). The rebuilding of Balmoral Castle as a baronial palace and its adoption as a royal retreat from 1855 to 1858 confirmed the popularity of the style.

In ecclesiastical architecture, a style with more in common to that in England was adopted, based on late Medieval models, often using arched windows, stained glass and carvings. Important figures included Frederick Thomas Pilkington (1832–98), who developed a new style of church building which accorded with the fashionable High Gothic. He adapted it for the worship needs of the Free Church of Scotland, as at Barclay Viewforth Church, Edinburgh (1862–64). Robert Rowand Anderson (1834–1921), who trained in the office of George Gilbert Scott in London before returning to Edinburgh, worked mainly on small churches in the 'First Pointed' (or Early English) style that is characteristic of Scott's former assistants. By 1880 his practice was designing some of the most prestigious public and private buildings in Scotland, such as the Scottish National Portrait Gallery; the Dome of Old College, Medical Faculty and McEwan Hall, University of Edinburgh; the Central Hotel at Glasgow Central station, the Catholic Apostolic Church in Edinburgh and Mount Stuart House on the Isle of Bute.

=== Classical revival ===
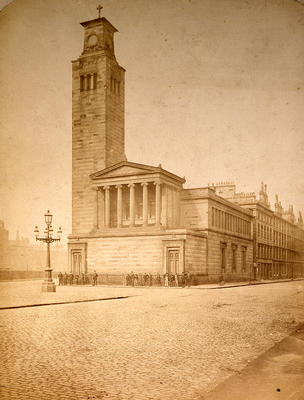
Alexander Thomson's Caledonia Road Church, Glasgow

Although eclipsed by Scots Baronial and Gothic forms, Neo-classicism continued to be a major style into the nineteenth century. William Henry Playfair (1790–1857) was the designer of many of Edinburgh's neoclassical landmarks in the New Town. Two of his finest works are the National Gallery of Scotland and the Royal Scottish Academy, which are situated in the centre of Edinburgh. However, the figure most associated with the classical style was Alexander "Greek" Thomson (1817–75). Working mainly in Glasgow, he turned away from the Gothic style toward that of the ancient Greeks and Egyptians, as can be seen in the temple and columns that were part of the Caledonia Road Church (1856).

David Rhind (1808–83) employed both neoclassical and Baronial styles and his work included many branches of the Commercial Bank of Scotland, among them their headquarters in Edinburgh. He also designed a number of churches, local government buildings, and houses. One of his grandest schemes was Daniel Stewart's Hospital, now Stewart's Melville College, Edinburgh. In 1849, he was commissioned to design the lay-out of the Pollokshields area of Glasgow, in what until then had been farmland 2 miles (3.2 km) south of the city centre. Rhind formed a partnership with Robert Hamilton Paterson (1843–1911) who executed major works for brewers, malters and warehouse-men (for which Edinburgh was a centre), including design of the Abbey, James Calder & Co., Castle, Holyrood, Drybrough's, Caledonian and Clydesdale Breweries; and also work for McVitie and Price. The partnership was to execute important projects such as the Queen Victoria Memorial at Liverpool and the Royal Scots War Memorial in St Giles' Cathedral, Edinburgh.

=== New engineering ===
The nineteenth century saw some major engineering projects including Thomas Telford's (1757–1834) stone Dean Bridge (1829–31) and iron Craigellachie Bridge (1812–14). In the 1850s the possibilities of new wrought- and cast-iron construction were explored in the building of commercial warehouses in Glasgow. This adopted a round-arched Venetian style first used by Alexander Kirkland (1824–92) at the heavily ornamented 37–51 Miller Street (1854) and translated into iron in John Baird I's Gardner's Warehouse (1855–6), with an exposed iron frame and almost uninterrupted glazing. Most industrial buildings avoided this cast-iron aesthetic, like William Spence's (1806?–83) Elgin Engine Works built in 1856-8, using massive rubble blocks.

The most important engineering project was the Forth Bridge, a cantilever railway bridge over the Firth of Forth in the east of Scotland, 9 miles (14 km) west of central Edinburgh. Construction of a suspension bridge designed by Thomas Bouch (1822–80), was stopped after the collapse of another of his works, the Tay Bridge. The project was taken over by John Fowler (1817–98) and Benjamin Baker (1840–1907), who designed a structure that was built by Glasgow-based company Sir William Arrol & Co. from 1883. It was opened on 4 March 1890, and spans a total length of 8,296 feet (2,529 m). It was the first major structure in Britain to be constructed of steel; its contemporary, the Eiffel Tower was built of wrought iron.

== See also ==
- Architecture in early modern Scotland
- Architecture in modern Scotland
- Architecture of Scotland
