= Acheson House (disambiguation) =

Acheson House is a 17th-century house in the Old Town of Edinburgh, Scotland.

Acheson House may also refer to:

- Edward G. Acheson House, Monongahela, Pennsylvania
- Bishop Acheson House, Middletown, Connecticut
