= Architecture in early modern Scotland =

Buildings in Scotland during the 16th and 18th century

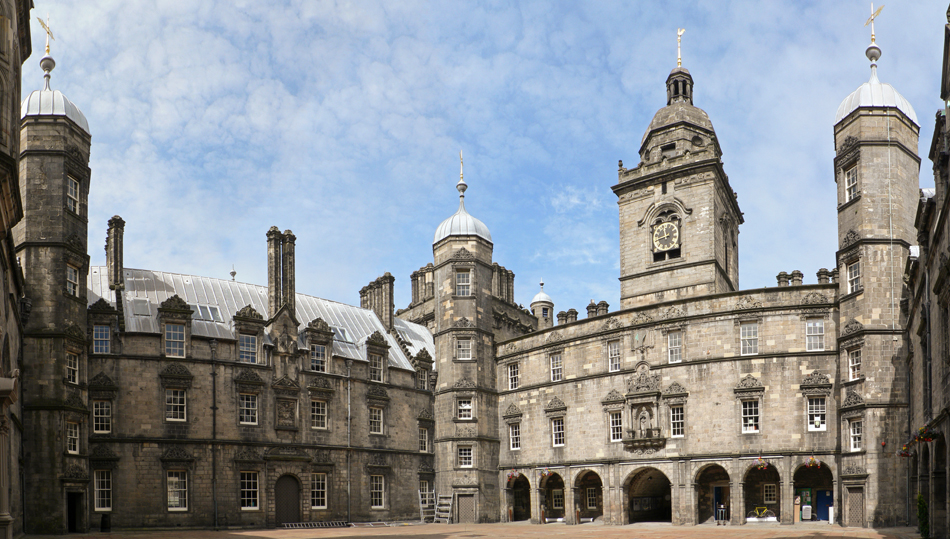
The seventeenth-century quadrangle of Heriot's Hospital, Edinburgh, showing many of the key features of the Scots Baronial style

Architecture in early modern Scotland encompasses all building within the borders of the kingdom of Scotland, from the early sixteenth century to the mid-eighteenth century. The time period roughly corresponds to the early modern era in Europe, beginning with the Renaissance and Reformation and ending with the start of the Enlightenment and Industrialisation.

Vernacular architecture made use of local materials such as stone, turf and, where available, wood. Most of the population was housed in small hamlets and isolated dwellings. The most common form of dwelling throughout Scotland was the long house, shared by humans and animals. About ten percent of the population lived in the burghs, in a mixture of half-timbered and stone houses.

The impact of the Renaissance on Scottish architecture began in the reign of James III in the late fifteenth century with the rebuilding of royal palaces such as Linlithgow, and reached its peak under James V. The Reformation had a major impact on ecclesiastical architecture from the mid-sixteenth century onward, resulting in simple church buildings, devoid of ornamentation. From the 1560s great private houses were built in a distinctive style that became known as Scottish Baronial. Such houses combined Renaissance features with those of Scottish castles and tower houses, resulting in larger, more comfortable residences.

After the Restoration in 1660, there was a fashion for grand private houses in designs influenced by the Palladian style and associated with the architects Sir William Bruce (1630–1710) and James Smith (c. 1645–1731). After the Act of Union in 1707, the threat of Jacobite Rebellions led to the building of military defences such as Fort George near Inverness. Scotland produced some of the most significant architects of the eighteenth century, including Colen Campbell, James Gibbs and William Adam, who all had a major influence on Georgian architecture across Britain. The influence of Gibbs led to churches that employed classical elements, with a pedimented rectangular plan and often with a steeple.

== Vernacular architecture ==
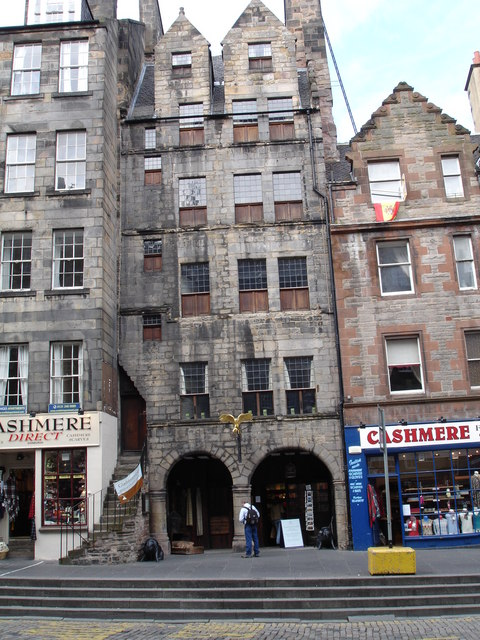
The six-storey Gladstone's Land, Edinburgh, demonstrating the tendency to build up in the growing burghs

The vernacular architecture of Scotland, as elsewhere, made use of local materials and methods. The homes of the poor were usually of very simple construction, and were built by groups of family and friends. Stone is plentiful throughout Scotland and was a common building material, employed in both mortared and dry stone construction. As in English vernacular architecture, where wood was available, crucks (pairs of curved timbers) were often used to support the roof. With a lack of long span structural timber, the crucks were sometimes raised and supported on the walls. Walls were often built of stone, and could have gaps filled with turf, or plastered with clay. In some regions wattled walls filled in with turf were employed, sometimes on a stone base. Turf-filled walls were not long-lasting, and had to be rebuilt perhaps as often as every two or three years. In some regions, including the south-west and around Dundee, solid clay walls were used, or combinations of clay, turf and straw, rendered with clay or lime to make them weatherproof. Different regions used turfs, or thatch of broom, heather, straw or reeds for roofing.

Most of the early modern population, in both the Lowlands and Highlands, was housed in small hamlets and isolated dwellings. As the population expanded, some of these settlements were sub-divided to create new hamlets and more marginal land was settled, with shielings (clusters of huts occupied while summer pasture was being used for grazing), becoming permanent settlements. The standard layout of a house throughout Scotland before agricultural improvement was a byre-dwelling or long house, with humans and livestock sharing a common roof, often separated by only a partition wall. Contemporaries noted that cottages in the Highlands and Islands tended to be cruder, with single rooms, slit windows and earthen floors, often shared by a large family. In contrast, many Lowland cottages had distinct rooms and chambers, were clad with plaster or paint and even had glazed windows.

Perhaps ten percent of the population lived in one of many burghs that had grown up in the later Medieval period, mainly in the east and south of the country. A characteristic of Scottish burghs was a long main street of tall buildings, with vennels, wynds and alleys leading off it, many of which survive today. In towns, traditional thatched half-timbered houses were interspersed with the larger stone and slate-roofed town houses of merchants and the urban gentry. Most wooden thatched houses have not survived, but stone houses of the period can be seen in Edinburgh at Lady Stair's House, Acheson House and the six-storey Gladstone's Land, an early example of the tendency to build upward in the increasingly crowded towns, producing horizontally divided tenements. Many burghs acquired tollbooths in this period, which acted as town halls, courts and prisons. They often had peels of bells or clock towers and the aspect of a fortress. The Old Tolbooth, Edinburgh was rebuilt on the orders of Mary Queen of Scots from 1561 and housed the parliament until the end of the 1630s. Other examples can be seen at Tain, Culross and Stonehaven, often showing influences from the Low Countries in their crow-stepped gables and steeples.

== Renaissance ==
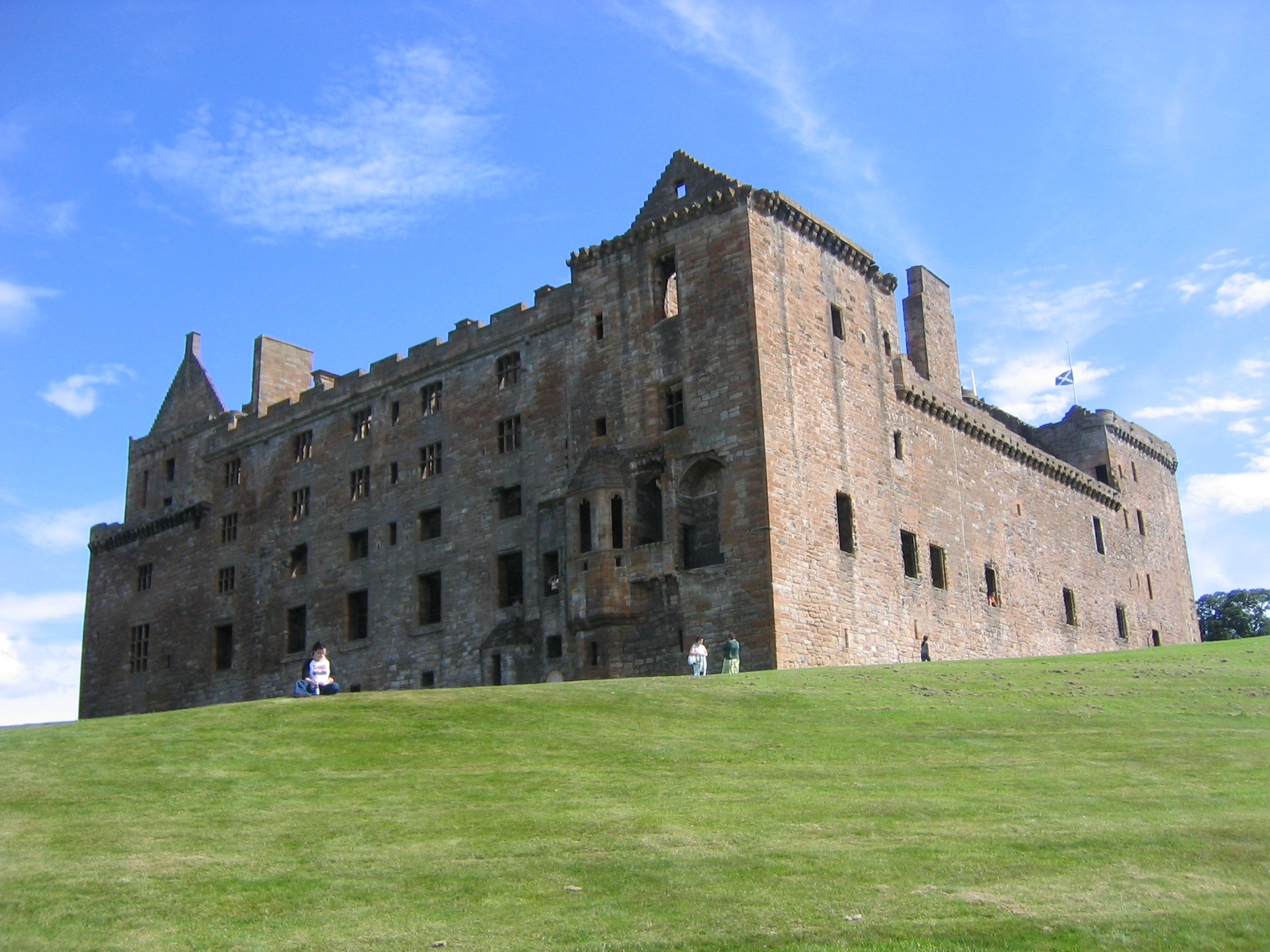
Linlithgow Palace, the first building to bear the title "palace" in Scotland, extensively rebuilt along Renaissance principles from the fifteenth century

The extensive building and rebuilding of royal palaces probably began under James III (r. 1460–88), accelerated under James IV (r. 1488–1513) and reached its peak under James V (r. 1513–42). The influence of Renaissance architecture is reflected in these buildings. Linlithgow was first constructed under James I (r. 1406–27), under the direction of master of work John de Waltoun and was referred to as a palace from 1429, apparently the first use of this term in the country. It was extended under James III and resembled a quadrangular, corner-towered Italian signorial palace or palatium ad moden castri (a castle-style palace), combining classical symmetry with neo-chivalric imagery. There is evidence that Italian masons were employed by James IV, in whose reign Linlithgow was completed and other palaces were rebuilt with Italianate proportions.

In 1536 James V visited France for his marriage to Madeleine of Valois and would have come in contact with French Renaissance architecture. His second marriage to Mary of Guise two years later may have resulted in longer-term connections and influences. Architecture from his reign largely disregarded the insular style of England under Henry VIII and adopted forms that were recognisably European. Rather than slavishly copying continental forms, most Scottish architecture incorporated elements of these styles into traditional local patterns, adapting them to Scottish idioms and materials (particularly stone and harl). Some decorative wood carvings were made by French craftsmen, who like Andrew Mansioun, settled in Scotland. The building at Linlithgow was followed by rebuilding at Holyrood Palace, Falkland Palace, Stirling Castle and Edinburgh Castle, described by Roger Mason as "some of the finest examples of Renaissance architecture in Britain".

Many of the building programs were planned and financed by James Hamilton of Finnart, Steward of the Royal Household and Master of Works to James V. He was also responsible for the architectural works at Blackness Castle, Rothesay Castle, the house at Crawfordjohn, the New Inn in the St Andrews Cathedral Priory and the lodging at Balmerino Abbey for the ailing Queen Madeleine. For the six years of her regency Mary of Guise employed an Italian military architect, Lorenzo Pomarelli. Work undertaken for James VI demonstrated continued Renaissance influences; the Chapel Royal at Stirling has a classical entrance built in 1594 and the North Wing of Linlithgow, built in 1618, uses classical pediments. Similar themes can be seen in the private houses of aristocrats, as in Mar's Wark, Stirling (c. 1570) and Crichton Castle, built for the Earl of Bothwell in 1580s.

== Reformation ==
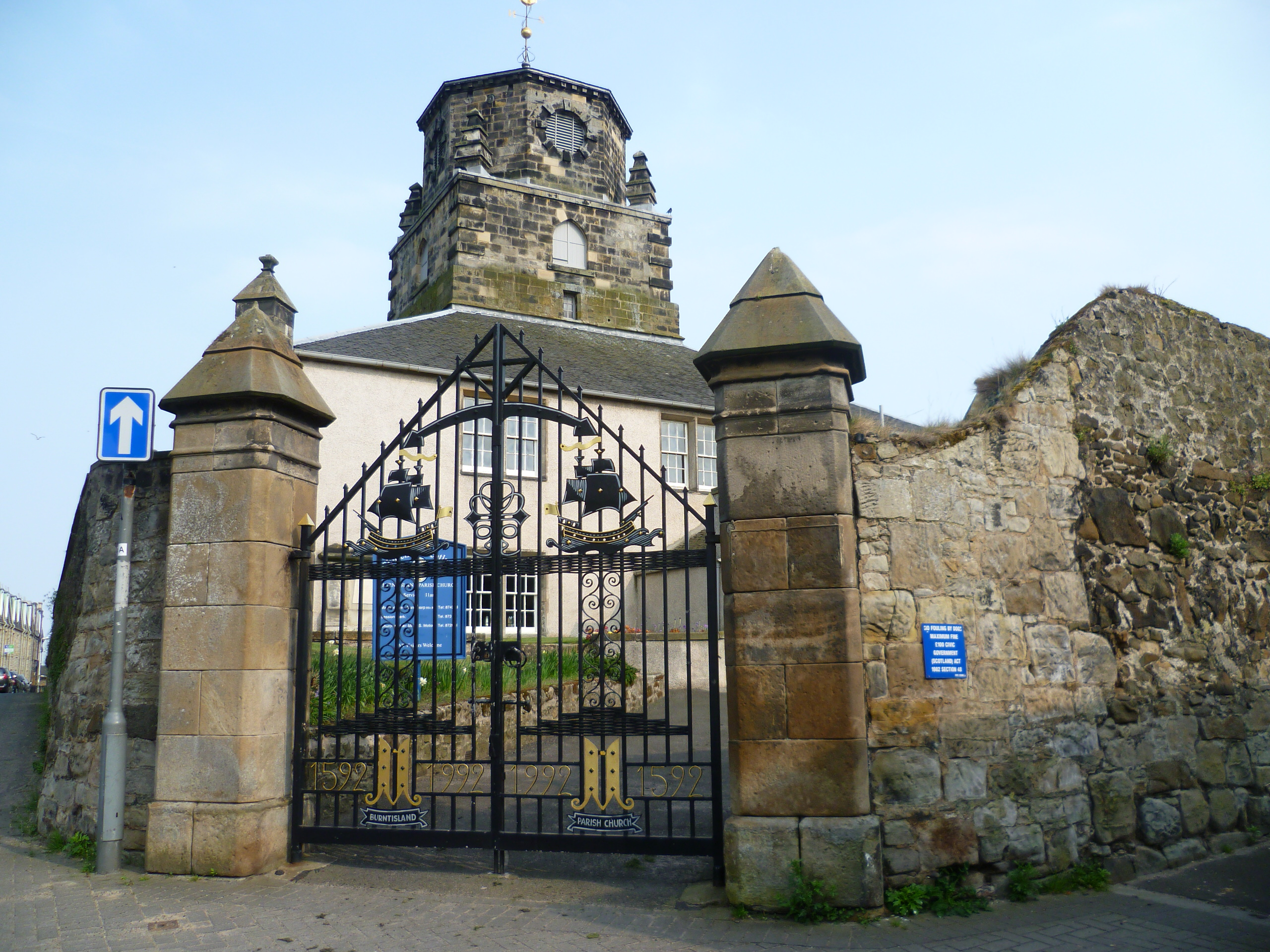
Burntisland Parish Kirk, its original wooden steeple now replaced by one of stone

From about 1560, the Reformation revolutionised church architecture in Scotland. Calvinists rejected ornamentation in places of worship, seeing no need for elaborate buildings divided up for the purpose of ritual. This resulted in the widespread destruction of Medieval church furnishings, ornaments and decoration. New churches were built and existent churches adapted for reformed services, particularly by placing the pulpit centrally in the church, as preaching was at the centre of worship. Many of the earliest buildings were simple gabled rectangles, a style that continued into the seventeenth century, as at Dunnottar Castle in the 1580s, Greenock (1591) and Durness (1619). These churches often have windows on the south wall (and none on the north), which became a characteristic of Reformation kirks. There were continuities with pre-Reformation materials, with some churches using rubble for walls, as at Kemback in Fife (1582). Others employed dressed stone and a few added wooden steeples, as at Burntisland (1592). The church of Greyfriars, Edinburgh, built between 1602 and 1620, used a rectangular layout with a largely Gothic form, but that at Dirleton (1612), had a more sophisticated classical style.

A variation of the rectangular church developed in post-Reformation Scotland, and often used when adapting existing churches, was the T-shaped plan, which allowed the maximum number of parishioners to be near the pulpit. Examples can be seen at Kemback and Prestonpans after 1595. This plan continued to be used into the seventeenth century as at Weem (1600), Anstruther Easter, Fife (1634–44) and New Cumnock (1657). In the seventeenth century a Greek cross plan was used for churches such as Cawdor (1619) and Fenwick (1643). In most of these cases one arm of the cross would have been closed off as a laird's aisle, meaning that they were in effect T-plan churches.

== Scots Baronial ==
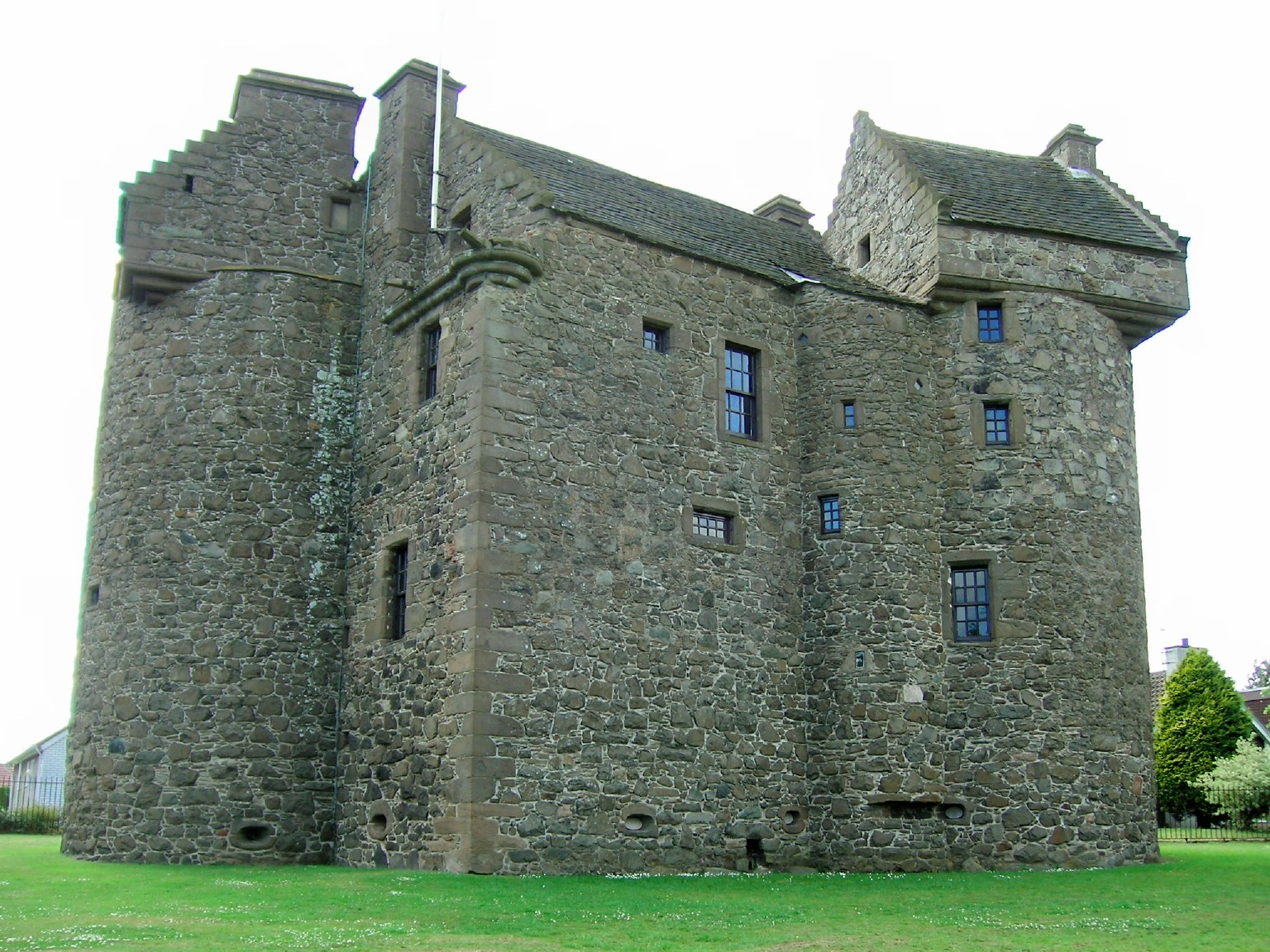
The sixteenth-century Claypotts Castle, showing many of the features of the Baronial style

The unique style of great private houses in Scotland, later known as Scots Baronial, originated in the 1560s and may have been influenced by the French masons brought to Scotland to work on royal palaces. It kept many of the features of the high walled Medieval castles that had been largely made obsolete by gunpowder weapons and also drew on the tower houses and peel towers that had been built in their hundreds by local lords since the fourteenth century, particularly in the borders. These houses abandoned the defensible curtain walls of castles, being fortified refuges that were designed to outlast a raid, rather than a sustained siege. They were usually of three stories, typically crowned with a parapet, projecting on corbels, continuing into circular bartizans at each corner. The new houses built from the late sixteenth century by nobles and lairds were primarily designed for comfort, not for defence. They retained many of the external features that had become associated with nobility but with a larger ground plan, classically a "Z-plan" of a rectangular block with towers, as at Colliston Castle (1583) and Claypotts Castle (1569–88).

Towers were typically set in gated yards enclosing lower buildings, such as kitchens, breweries, and stables. The yard buildings at the House of Fiddes were listed in a schedule of roofing works in 1624. There was a "womanhouse", where domestic textile work such as spinning was carried out.

William Wallace, the king's master mason from 1617 until his death in 1631, was particularly influential. He worked on the rebuilding of the collapsed North Range of Linlithgow from 1618, Winton House for George Seton, 3rd Earl of Winton, Moray House for the Countess of Home, and began work on Heriot's Hospital, Edinburgh. He adopted a distinctive style that applied elements of Scottish fortification and Flemish influences to a Renaissance plan similar to that used at Château d'Ancy-le-Franc. This style can be seen in lords' houses built at Caerlaverlock (1620), Moray House, Edinburgh (1628) and Drumlanrig Castle (1675–89), and was highly influential until the Baronial style gave way to the grander English forms associated with Inigo Jones in the later seventeenth century.

== Commonwealth and Restoration ==
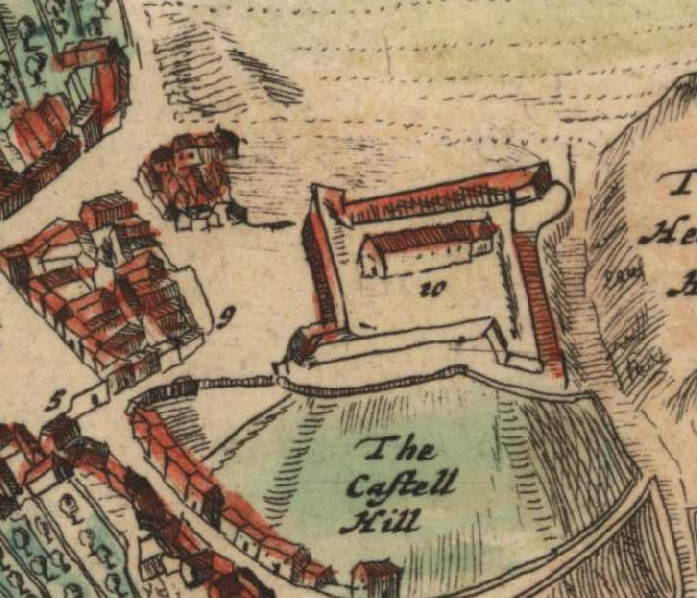
Detail of a map of Aberdeen in 1661, showing the fort erected during the Commonwealth

During the turbulent era of the Civil Wars and the incorporation of Scotland into a Commonwealth of England, Scotland and Ireland, significant building in Scotland was largely confined to military architecture. Polygonal fortresses with triangular bastions in the style of the trace italienne were built to house English soldiers at Ayr, Perth and Leith, and 20 smaller forts were built as far apart as Orkney and Stornoway. Control of the Highlands was secured by new strongpoints at Inverlocky and Inverness. The universities saw an improvement in their funding, as they were given income from deaneries, defunct bishoprics and the excise, allowing the completion of buildings including the college in the High Street in Glasgow. After the Restoration in 1660, large-scale building began again, influenced by a growing interest in Classicism.

=== Palaces and estate houses ===
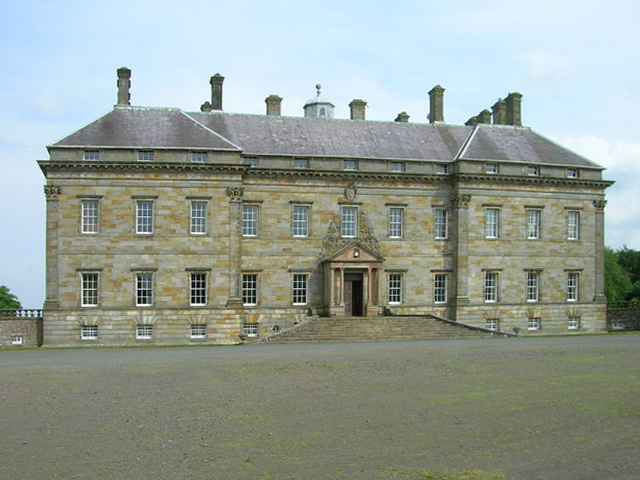
Kinross House, one of the first Palladian houses in Britain

Sir William Bruce (c. 1630–1710) is considered "the effective founder of classical architecture in Scotland" and was the key figure in introducing the Palladian style to the country. Andrea Palladio (1508–80) was an influential architect who worked in the region of Venice in the sixteenth century and whose buildings are characterised by symmetry, fine proportion and formal elements drawn from Ancient Classical architecture. In England the introduction of the Palladian style is associated with Inigo Jones (1573–1652). Bruce's architectural style incorporated Palladian elements and was influenced by Jones, but also borrowed from the Italian Baroque and was most strongly influenced by Sir Christopher Wren's (1632–1723) interpretation of the Baroque in England. Bruce popularised a style of country house among the Scottish nobility that encouraged a move towards a more leisure-oriented architecture already adopted in continental Europe. He built and remodelled country houses, including Thirlestane Castle and Prestonfield House. Among his most significant work was his own Palladian mansion at Kinross, built on the Loch Leven estate he had purchased in 1675. Bruce's houses were predominantly built using well-cut ashlar masonry on the façades; rubble stonework was used only for internal walls. As the Surveyor and Overseer of the Royal Works Bruce undertook the rebuilding of the Royal Palace of Holyroodhouse in the 1670s, giving the palace its present appearance. After the death of Charles II in 1685, Bruce lost political favour, and following the Glorious Revolution of 1688 he was imprisoned more than once as a suspected Jacobite.

James Smith (c. 1645–1731) worked as a mason on Bruce's rebuilding of Holyrood Palace. In 1683 he was appointed Surveyor and Overseer of the Royal Works, responsible for the palace's maintenance. With his father-in-law, the master mason Robert Mylne (1633–1710), Smith worked on Caroline Park in Edinburgh (1685), and Drumlanrig Castle (1680s). Smith's country houses followed the pattern established by William Bruce, with hipped roofs and pedimented fronts, in a plain but handsome Palladian style. Hamilton Palace (1695) was fronted by giant Corinthian columns, and a pedimented entrance, but was otherwise restrained. Dalkeith Palace (1702–10) was modelled after William of Orange's palace at Het Loo in the Netherlands.

=== Churches ===
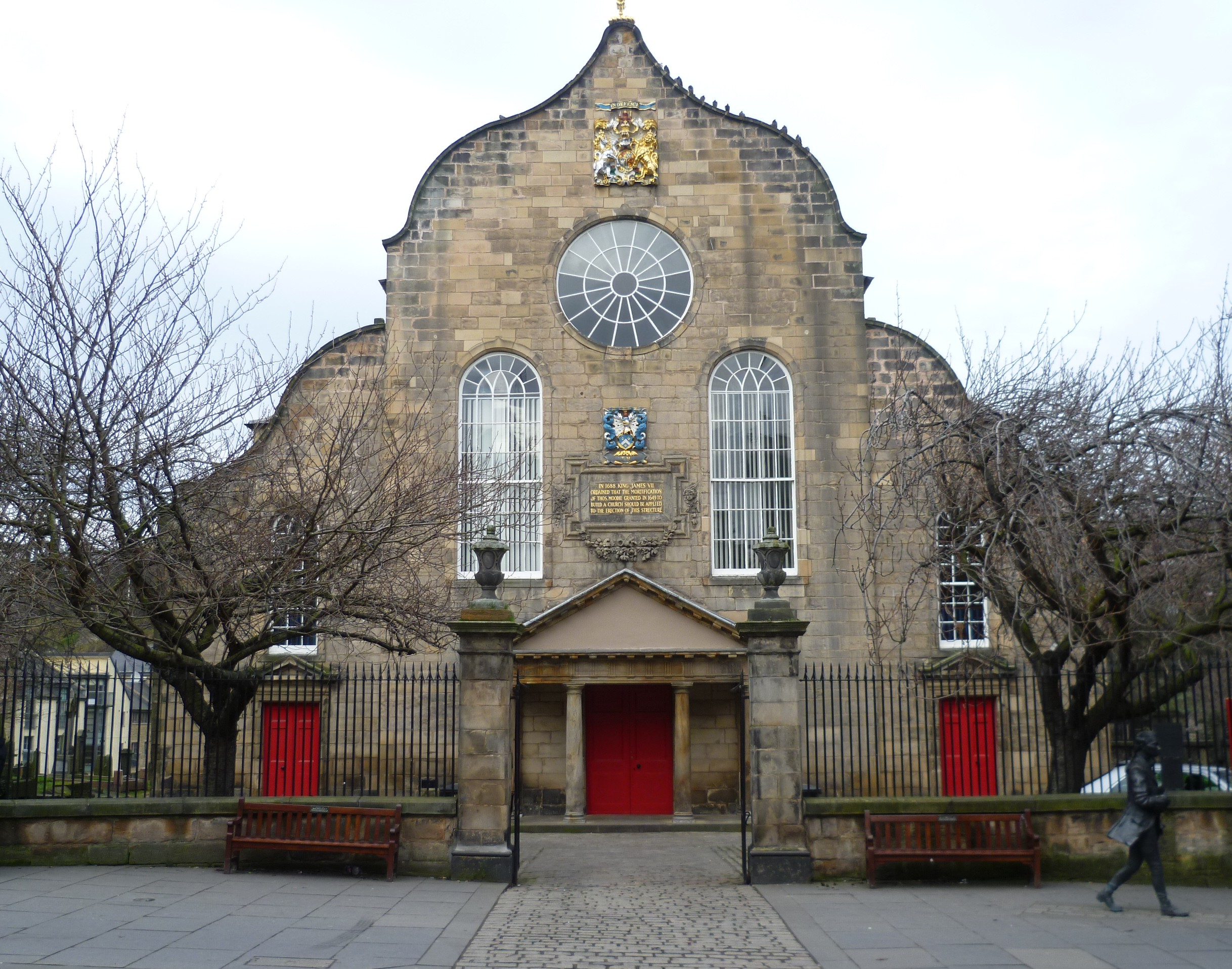
The front of Canongate Kirk in Edinburgh's Old Town, designed by James Smith

By the later seventeenth century both the Presbyterian and Episcopalian wings of the church had adopted the modestly sized and plain form of churches that had emerged after the Reformation. Most had a centralised plan with two or three arms, in a rectangular or T-planned arrangement. Steeples continued to be a major feature, either centrally on the long axis, or on an end gable, as had been the case in pre-Reformation churches. As a result, there was little of the Baroque extravagance in church building seen on the continent and England. Some minor innovations may indicate a move back toward episcopacy in the Restoration era. Lauder Church was built by Bruce in 1673 for the Duke of Lauderdale, who championed the bishops in the reign of Charles II. The Gothic windows may have emphasised antiquity, but its basic Greek cross plan remained within the existing common framework of new churches.

The major exceptions to the common Greek cross plan are in the work of Smith, who had become a Jesuit in his youth. These included the rebuilding of Holyrood Abbey undertaken for James VII in 1687, which was outfitted in an elaborate style. In 1691 Smith designed the mausoleum of Sir George Mackenzie of Rosehaugh, in Greyfriars Kirkyard, a circular structure modelled on the Tempietto di San Pietro, designed by Donato Bramante (1444–1514). The drive to Episcopalian forms of worship may have resulted in more linear patterns, including rectangular plans with the pulpit at the end opposite the entrance. The Latin Cross form increasingly popular in Counter Reformation Catholicism, was also used, as in Smith's Canongate Kirk (1688–90), but the Presbyterian revolution of 1689–90 occurred before its completion and the chancel was blocked up, effectively transforming it into a T-plan.

== Early eighteenth century ==
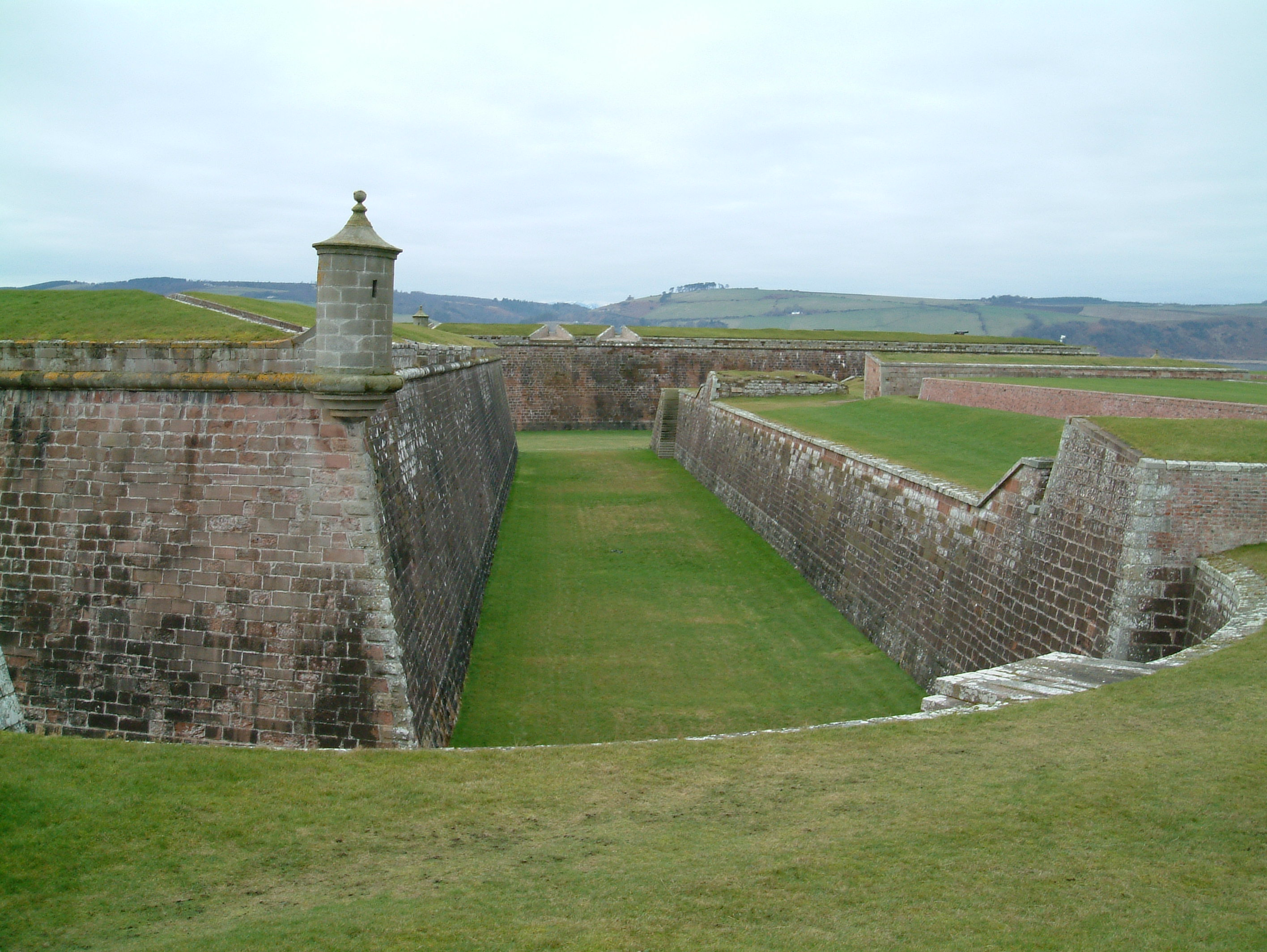
The outworks of Fort George, built in response to the threat of Jacobite risings in the eighteenth century

After the Act of Union of 1707, growing prosperity in Scotland led to a spate of new building, both public and private. The threat of Jacobite insurrection or invasion meant that Scotland saw more military building than England in this period. Military structures relied on the strength of inclined and angled engineered masonry and earthen toppings to deflect and absorb artillery fire. This spate of military building culminated in the construction of Fort George near Inverness (1748–69), with its projecting bastions and redoubts.

=== Country houses ===
Scotland produced some of the most significant architects of the early eighteenth century, including Colen Campbell (1676–1729), James Gibbs (1682–1754) and William Adam (1689–1748), all of whom were influenced by Classical architecture. Campbell was influenced by the Palladian style and has been credited with founding Georgian architecture. Architectural historian Howard Colvin has speculated that he was associated with James Smith and may even have been his pupil. He spent most of his career in Italy and England and developed a rivalry with fellow Scot James Gibbs, who trained in Rome and also practised mainly in England. Campbell's architectural style incorporated Palladian elements, as well as forms from the Italian Baroque and Inigo Jones, but was most strongly influenced by Sir Christopher Wren's interpretation of the Baroque. William Adam, the foremost Scottish architect of his time, designed and built numerous country houses and public buildings. Among his best known works are Hopetoun House near Edinburgh, and Duff House in Banff. His individual, exuberant, style was built on the Palladian style, but with Baroque motifs inspired by the work of John Vanbrugh and Continental architecture. After his death, his sons Robert and John took on the family business and became the leading British architects of the second half of the century.

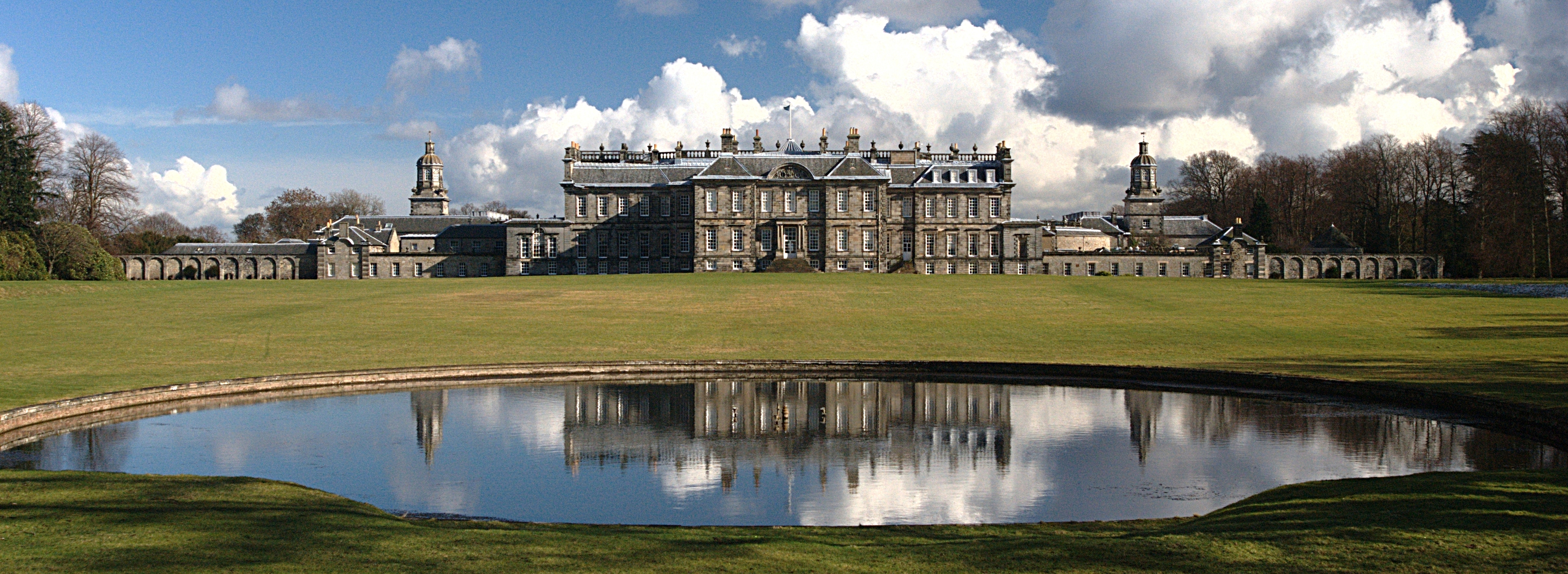
Hopetoun House, designed and built by William Adam

=== Neo-classical churches ===
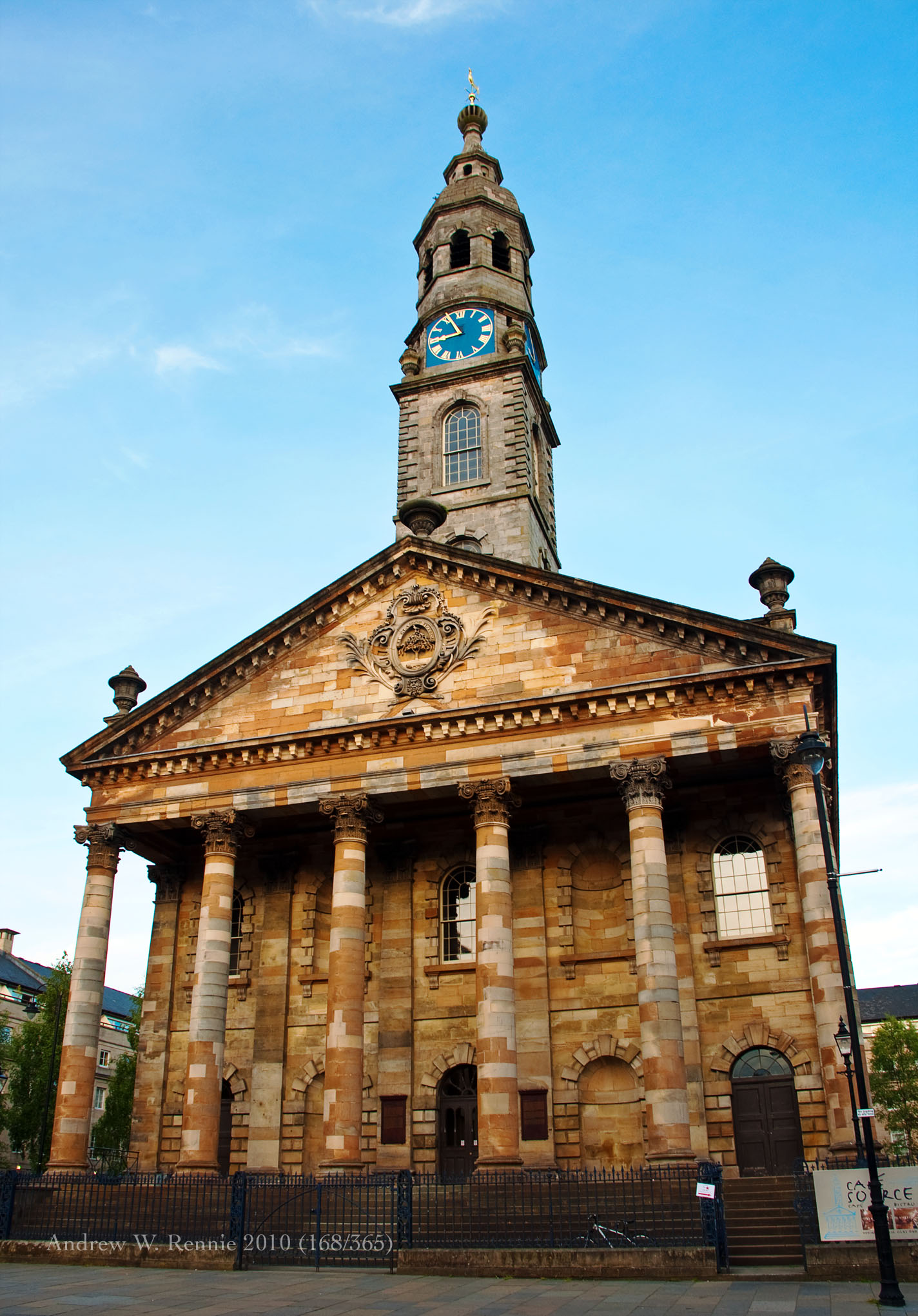
St. Andrew's in the Square, Glasgow shows the neo-classical influence

In the 18th century established patterns of church building continued, with T-shaped plans with steeples on the long side, as at New Church, Dumfries (1724–27), and Newbattle Parish Church (1727–29). William Adam's Hamilton Parish Church (1729–32), was a Greek cross plan inscribed in a circle, while John Douglas's Killin Church (1744) was octagonal. Scots-born architect James Gibbs was highly influential on British ecclesiastical architecture. He introduced a consciously antique style in his rebuilding of St Martin-in-the-Fields, London, with a massive, steepled portico and rectangular, side-aisled plan. Similar patterns in Scotland can be seen at St Andrew's in the Square (1737–59), designed by Allan Dreghorn and built by the master mason Mungo Nasmyth, and at the smaller Donibristle Chapel (completed in 1731), designed by Alexander McGill. Gibbs' own design for St. Nicholas West, Aberdeen (1752–55), had the same rectangular plan, with a nave-and-aisles, barrel-vaulted layout with superimposed pedimented front. After the Toleration Act 1711, Episcopalians began building a limited number of new chapels including Alexander Jaffray's St Paul's chapel in Aberdeen (1721), the meeting house designed by McGill in Montrose, an Edinburgh chapel opened in 1722 and St Andrew's-by-the-Green in Glasgow (1750–52), which adopted a simpler version of Gibbs' pedimented rectangular plan.

== See also ==
- Architecture of Scotland
- Architecture in Medieval Scotland
- Architecture in modern Scotland
- Domestic furnishing in early modern Scotland
