= Hill of Fiddes stone circle =

Recumbent stone circle in Aberdeenshire, Scotland

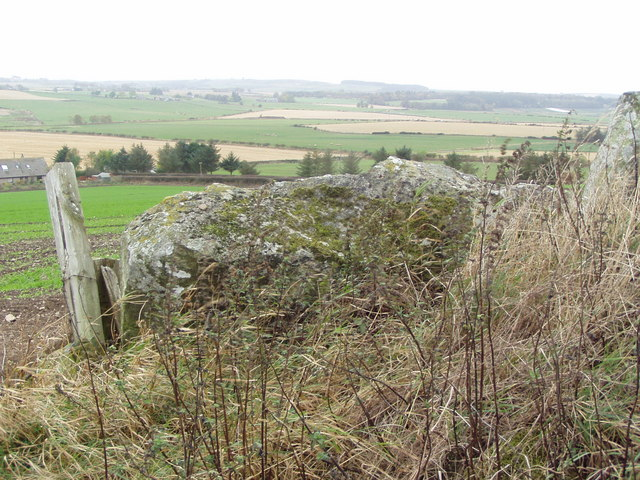
- The recumbent stone
- Interactive map of Hill of Fiddes stone circle
- 57.309410°N 2.1095373°W
- Type: Recumbent stone circle
- Periods: Neolithic
- Location: Aberdeenshire, Scotland
- OS grid reference: NJ93502432

History
- Built: c. 4000-2500 BC

Site notes
- Material: Granite
- Diameter: 14 m (46 ft)

Scheduled monument
- Official name: Hill of Fiddes
- Type: Prehistoric ritual and funerary: stone circle or ring
- Designated: 17 August 1925
- Reference no.: SM24

Hill of Fiddes stone circle is a ruined recumbent stone circle situated near Ellon, Aberdeenshire. Only two stones from the circle survive: the recumbent stone and an upright stone on its western side. The stones now form part of a field wall. The original stone circle had a diameter of approximately 14 m (46 ft).

The remains of the stone circle are a designated scheduled monument.

== Old House of Fiddes ==
A demolished castle or tower house at Fiddes belonged to the Forbes family. Adjacent to the main house in 1624 were buildings of a lower height known as the "laich biggins" around the sides of a gated yard. The "laich biggins" included a kitchen, an oven house, a brewhouse called a "geilhouse", a stable, an alehouse store which had formerly been a girnall for crops, and a "womanhouse" where domestic textiles works were located, a school house, the corner or "neuk chamber" which now served as a girnall.

The tenant farmers and tack holders of the laird of Fiddes were required to contribute to re-roofing the "laich buildings" in payment of their "plow silver" in July 1624. Only the buildings of the north side of the yard was slated, the other buildings were "theaked" with thatch or turf. Arthur Forbes, a tenant at Hill of Fiddes farm was required to roof half of the castle kitchen and brewery. The chapel at Hill of Fiddes was also re-roofed.

== See also ==
- Scheduled monuments in Aberdeenshire
