= Architecture in modern Scotland =

Buildings in Scotland during the 20th and 21st century

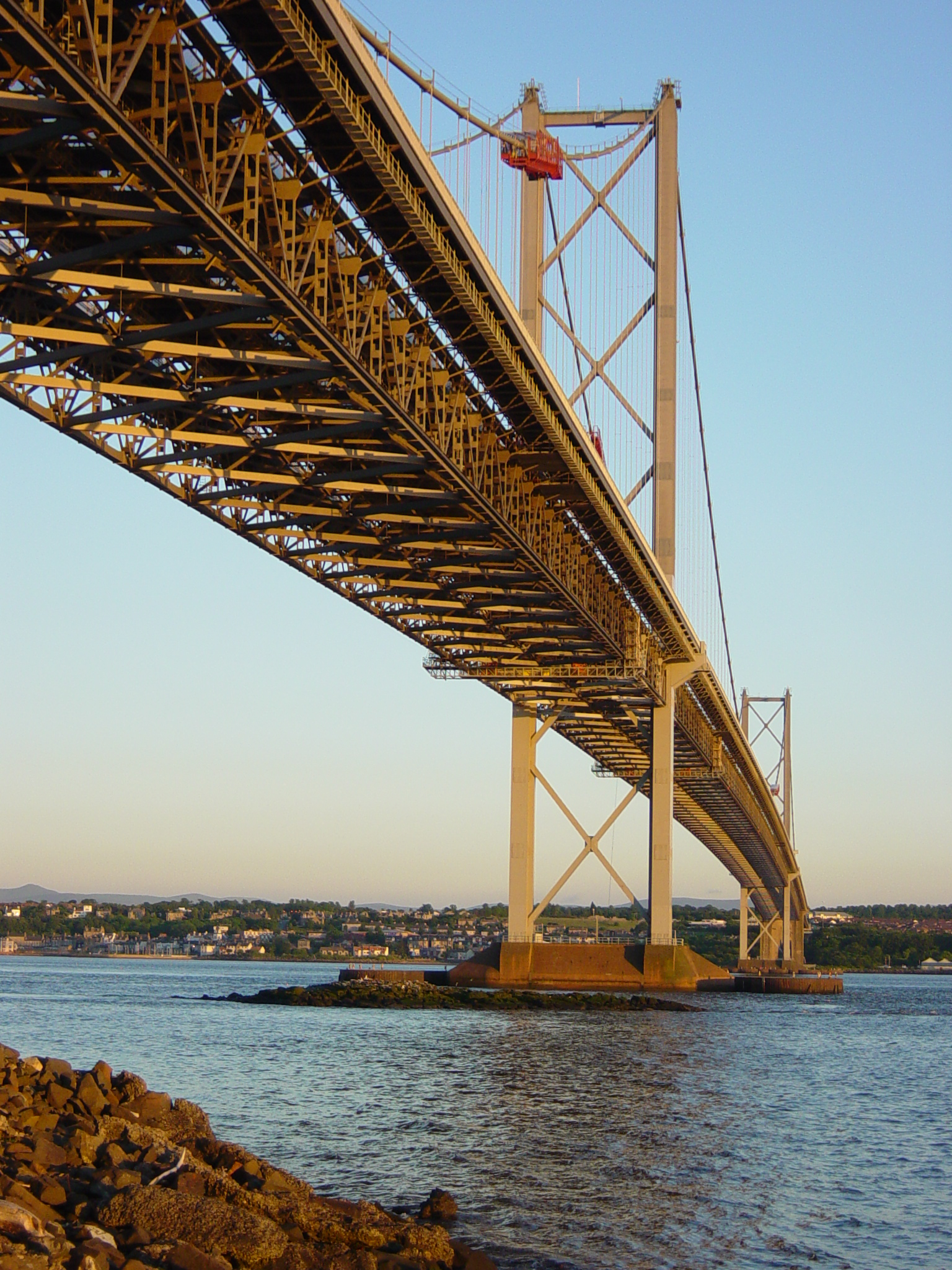
Forth Road Bridge, one of the prestigious architectural projects of the 1960s

Architecture in modern Scotland encompasses all building in Scotland, between the beginning of the twentieth century and the present day. The most significant architect of the early twentieth century was Charles Rennie Mackintosh, who mixed elements of traditional Scottish architecture with contemporary movements. Estate house design declined in importance in the twentieth century. In the early decades of the century, traditional materials began to give way to cheaper modern ones. After the First World War, Modernism and the office block began to dominate building in the major cities and attempts began to improve the quality of urban housing for the poor, resulted in a massive programme of council house building. The Neo-Gothic style continued in to the twentieth century but the most common forms in this period were plain and massive Neo-Romanesque buildings.

After the Second World War, brutalist tower blocks were adopted as a solution and this period saw the building of new towns, including Glenrothes and Cumbernauld, but the social and building problems of these constructions soon became apparent. The creation of new towns and council house estates necessitated the rapid supply of new churches. From the 1980s Scottish architecture began to recover its reputation, with new buildings like that created to house the Burrell Collection in Glasgow and more recently the Scottish Parliament Building in Edinburgh. There has also been urban regeneration, involving the replacement and renovation of existing buildings and landscapes. The 1980s saw the growth of speculative house building by developers and the introduction of English brick and half-timbered vernacular styles to Scotland. As the production of state sponsored housing subsided in the 1970s there was a return to conservatism in church design, but there were some original and post-modern designs from the 1980s.

== Glasgow style and the early twentieth century ==
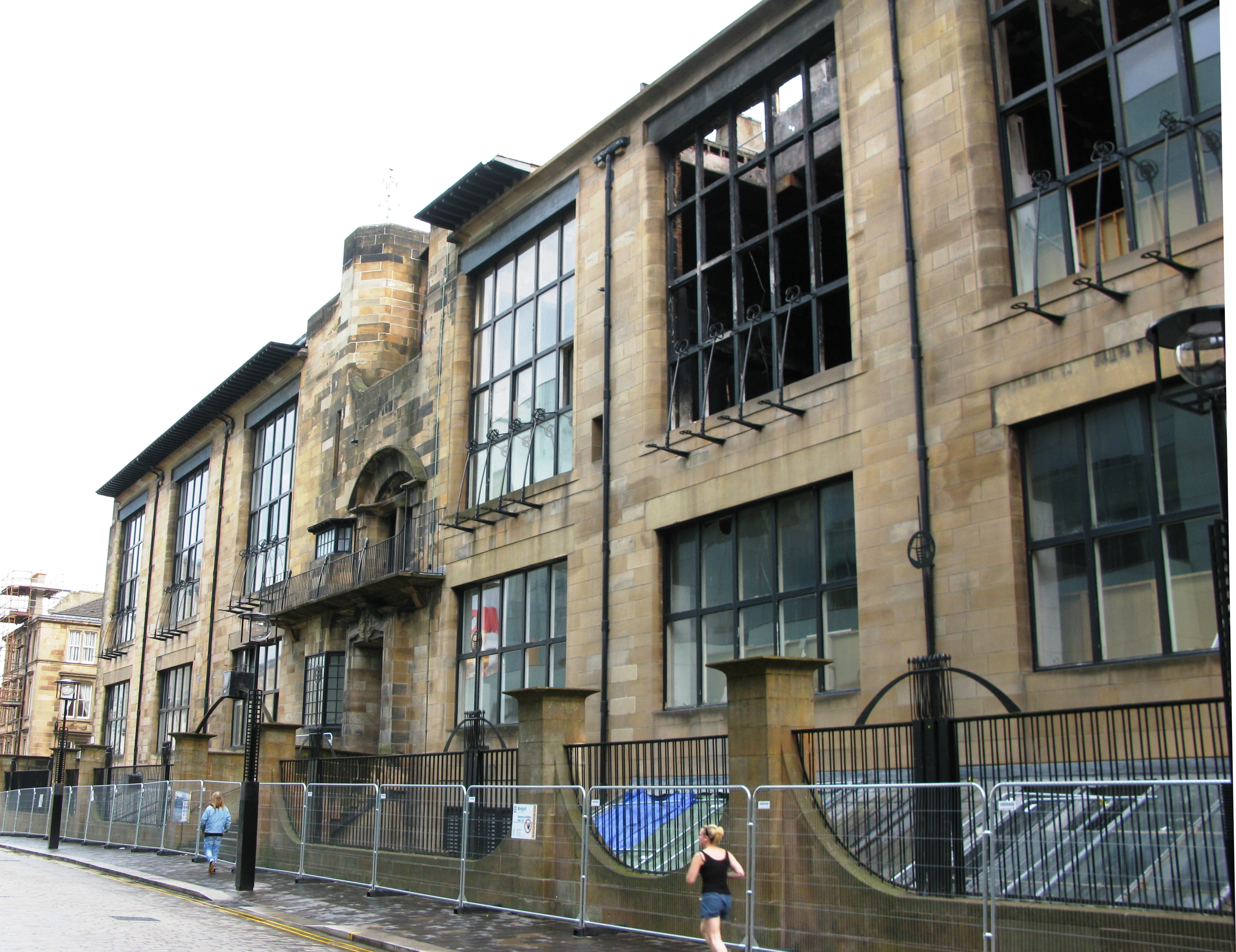
The Glasgow School of Art, considered one of the greatest designs of Charles Rennie Mackintosh

The most significant Scottish architect of the early twentieth century, having a considerable influence on European architecture, was Charles Rennie Mackintosh (1868–1928). He mixed elements of the Scottish baronial architecture, Arts and Crafts Movement and the Art Nouveau to produce elegant modern buildings. His major work included The Willow Tearooms in Sauchiehall Street, Glasgow (1903), Glasgow School of Art (1897–1909) and Hill House, Helensburgh (1902–04). The influence of Mackintosh's Glasgow style can be seen in the work of architects like James Salmon (1873–1924), whose designs included the heavily glass-fronted, Art Nouveau "Hatrack" (1899–1902) on Vincent Street and the Lion Chambers, Hope Street (1904–05), an early example of reinforced concrete construction.

Estate house design declined in importance in the twentieth century. An exception was the work undertaken by John Kinross (1855–1955). Beginning with the reconstruction of Thurston House, Dunbar, from 1890, he undertook a series of major country house designs. The most important was Manderston House (1901–03), built for James Miller in the Adam style. Skibo Castle was rebuilt for industrialist Andrew Carnegie (1899–1903) by Ross and Macbeth. English architect C. H. B. Quennell designed a neo-Georgian mansion at Altmore (1912–14) for the owner of a Moscow department store. There was a lull in building after the First World War and social change undermined the construction of rural country houses.

In the twentieth century the distinctive Scottish use of stone architecture declined as it was replaced by cheaper alternatives such as Portland cement, concrete, and mass-production brick. Stone would however be retained as a material for some housing stock in Edinburgh, Aberdeen and Dumfries, and would undergo revivals. In the twentieth century private architecture was increasingly client driven. James Robert Rhind (1854–1918), the son of David Rhind, was successful in the competition for new libraries to be constructed in Glasgow following Andrew Carnegie's gift of £100,000 to the city in 1901. His designs were selected for seven libraries, allowing him to demonstrate his individual interpretation of Edwardian Baroque architecture. Rhind's libraries were all built with locally quarried sandstone, which blended in with the existing tenement neighbourhoods. His landmark buildings were greatly enhanced by his liberal use of columns, domes and sculpted features. James Miller (1860–1947) is noted for his Scottish railway stations, such as his 1901–05 extensions to Glasgow Central railway station, and the spectacular Wemyss Bay railway station on the Firth of Clyde.

== Early modernism ==
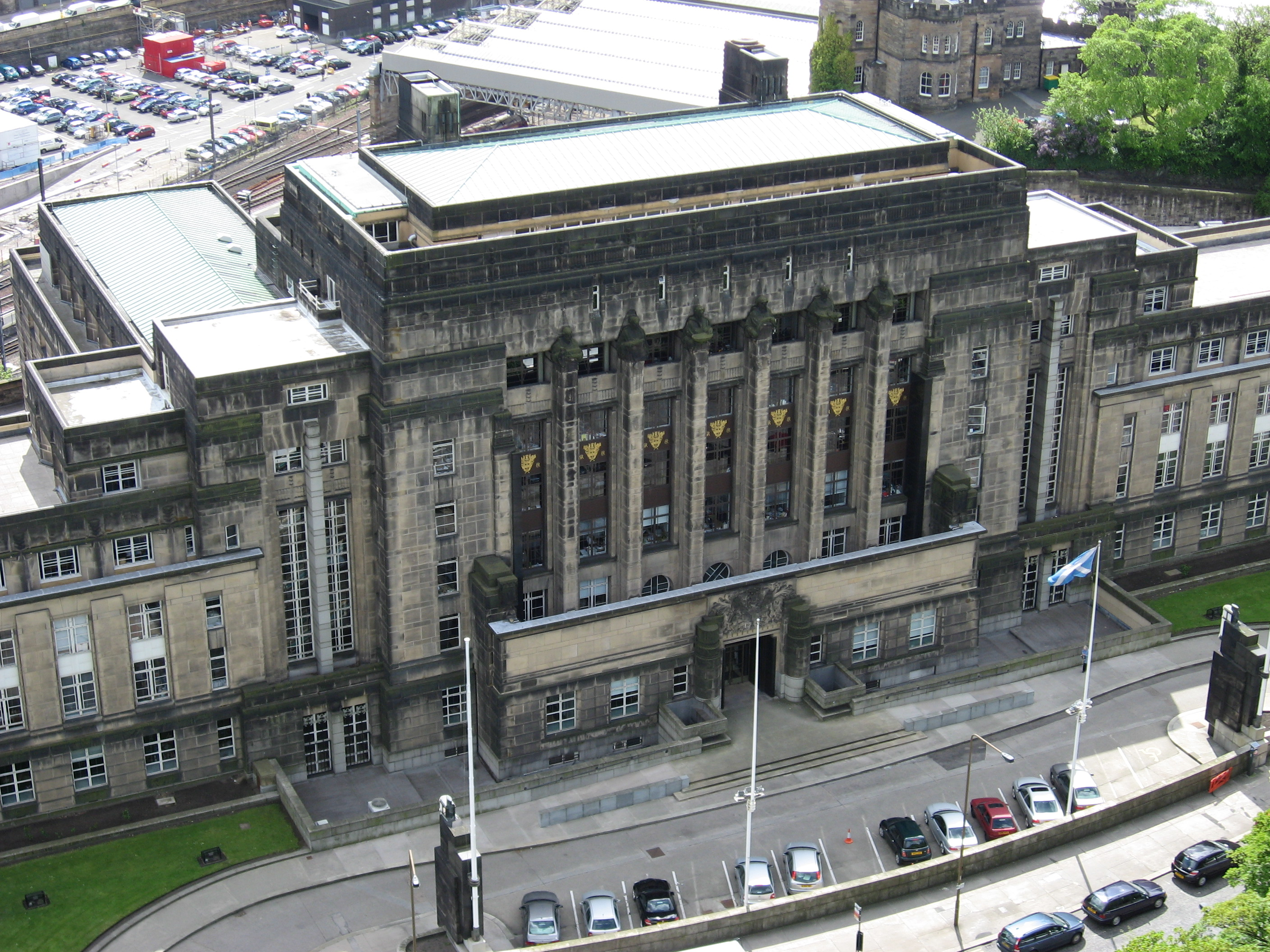
The north facade of St Andrew's House, from Nelson's Monument

After the First World War, Miller and his chief designer Richard Gunn (1889–1933) along with others, adapted to the growing needs of the office block. In Glasgow, with its central gridiron plan, this followed the practice in the United States of filling up entire blocks and building steel framed buildings as high as the fire marshal would allow, as in the heavily American-influenced Union Bank building (1924) at St Vincent Street. From the mid-twentieth century, public architecture became more utilitarian, as part of the impulse to produce a comprehensive welfare state. Thomas S. Tait (1882–1954) was among the most important modernist architects of the era, using pyramidal stepped designs for buildings like the St Andrew's House, Edinburgh (1935–39) built for the Scottish Office, and the 1939 "Tower of Empire" for the Empire Exhibition, Scotland 1938, held in Bellahouston Park, Glasgow. There was a lull in building after the First World War and social change undermined the construction of rural country houses. Isolated examples included the houses that combined modern and traditional elements, designed by Basil Spence and built at Broughton Place (1936) and Gribloch (1937–9). After World War Two a shortage of building materials further reduced the number of large luxury houses. Isolated examples included Logan House, designed by David Style in the 1950s. In the 1960s there was Basil Hughes's design at Snaigow for Earl Cadogan and the remodelling of Gask House by Claude Phillimore. This period also saw considerable restoration of existing houses.

During the First World War the government became increasingly aware of Scotland's housing problems, particularly after the Glasgow rent strike of 1915. A royal commission of 1917 reported on the "unspeakably filthy privy-middens in many of the mining areas, badly constructed incurably damp labourers' cottages on farms, whole townships unfit for human occupation in the crofting counties and islands ... groups of lightless and unventilated houses in the older burghs, clotted masses of slums in the great cities". The result was a massive programme of council house building. Many early council houses were built on greenfield sites away from the pollution of the city, often constructed of semi-detached homes or terraced cottages. Knightswood, north-west of Glasgow, was built as a show piece from 1923 to 1929, with a library, social centre and seven shopping "parades". In the 1930s schemes tended to be more cheaply built, like Blackhill, Glasgow, with a thousand houses built as two and three story tenements. These building schemes were designed to rehouse those displaced by urban slum clearance, by which thousands of tenements were demolished. However, often crammed into poor land near railways or gasworks, they soon became notorious. A survey of 1936 found that almost half of Scotland's houses were still inadequate.

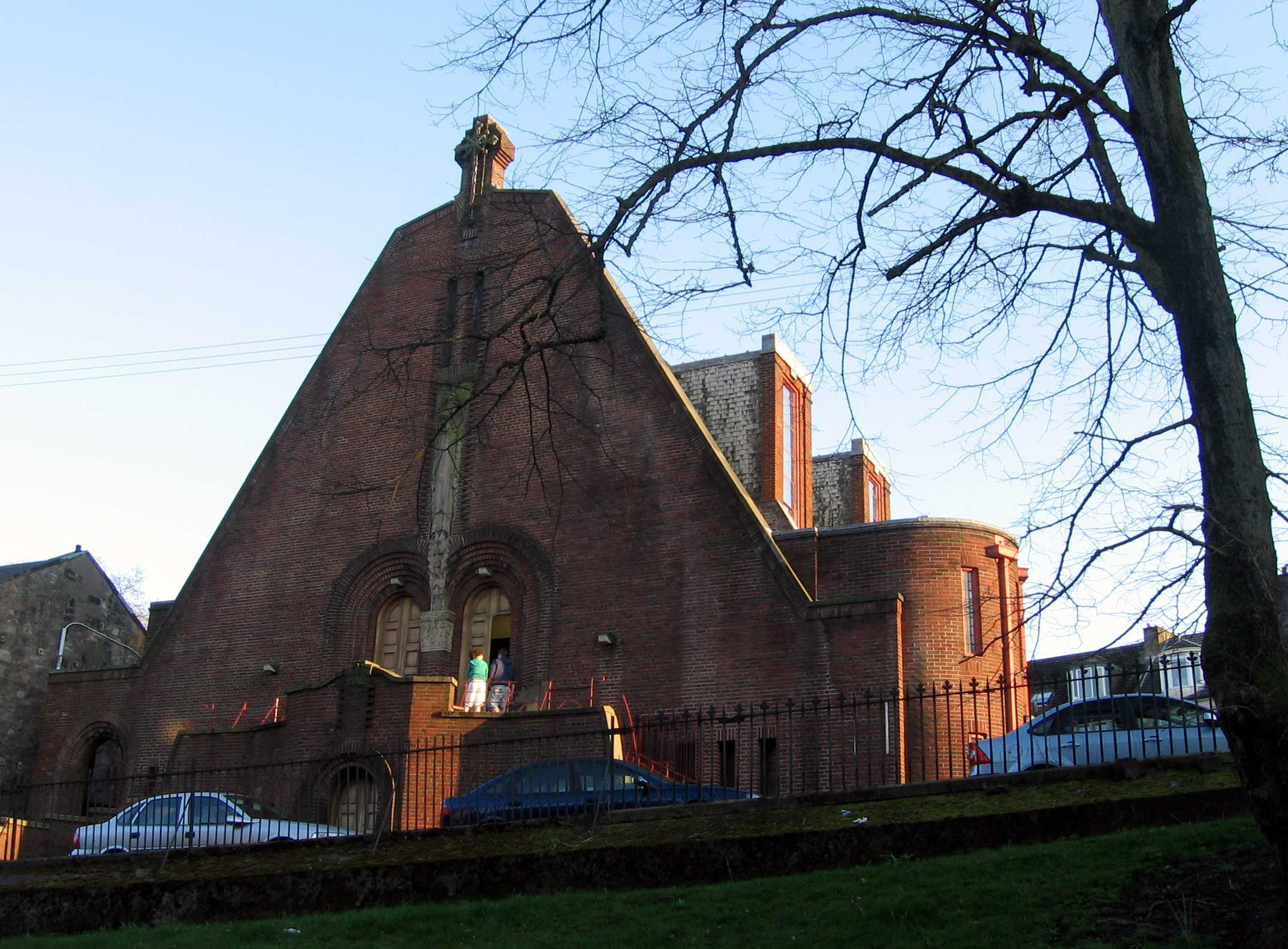
St. Patrick's Church, Orangefield in (1934–35) Greenock, one of Gillespie, Kidd & Coia pre-war brick-style architecture

The Neo-Gothic style that had become almost universal for church building in the late nineteenth century continued in to the twentieth, with examples including L. G. Thomson's Reid Memorial Church, Edinburgh (1929–33). However, the most common forms in this period were plain and massive Neo-Romanesque buildings. Protestant examples included H. O. Tarbolton's Bangour Village Church (1924–30) and Roman Catholic examples included Reginald Fairlie's Immaculate Conception Church, Fort William (1933–34). The reunification of the Church of Scotland in 1929 removed much of the need for new Presbyterian church-building, which was replaced by a tendency towards renovating nineteenth-century churches. The main tendency in church design in the 1930s was a move towards classicism. There were isolated large classical Protestant commissions, such as Bristo Baptist Church, Edinburgh (1933–35), but the major buildings in this form were in the Catholic Church where there was a movement towards worshipper-centred basilican plans, after the pontificate of Pius X (1903–14). This movement reached its peak in the 1960s after the Second Vatican Council. The leading figure in pursuing this style was Giacomo Antonio (Jack) Coia of Gillespie, Kidd & Coia. From the later 1920s he pursued a brick style of Catholic architecture. Coia's first church, St Anne's, Dennistoun (1931), utilised the engineering techniques of Beaux-Arts architecture, resulting in a broad, centralised space, with narrow arcades rather than aisles, with a monumental facade of red-brick. He used a more linear plan in subsequent designs, including St Patrick, Greenock (1934–35). Coia's partner T. Warnett Kennedy's temporary, open-roofed Catholic chapel at the Empire Exhibition (1938) was fronted by a Mackintosh-like grid of metalwork, and with his St Peter in Chains Church, Ardrossan (1938), with austere walls and towers, showed the influence of the "abstract compositions" of contemporary Swedish architecture and pointed to the future influence of modernism.

== Post-war brutalism ==
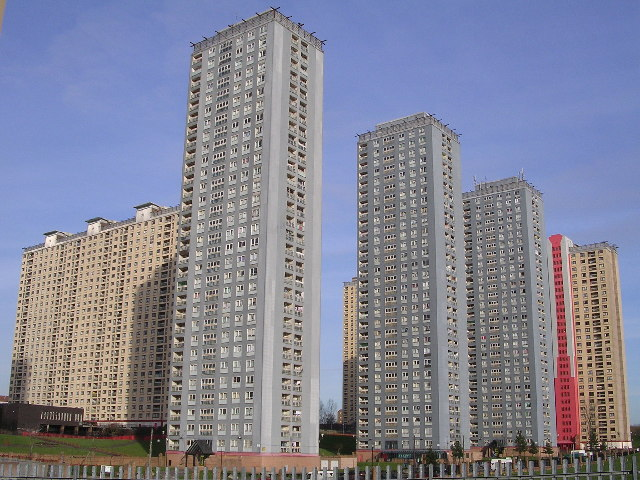
The eight towers of the brutalist Red Road Flats, Glasgow

In the post-war period Scotland continued to produce important architects, including James Stirling (1926–92), who, with James Gowan (1923–) designed the Flats at Ham Common, London (1955–58), considered a landmark in the development of modernist, brutalist residential planning, a style which would have a profound impact in Scotland. Their later work, almost all of it outside Scotland, would be highly influential on an international scale.

The main thrust of post-war planning would be one of clearance and rebuilding, beginning in Paisley, where from 1955 the populations of districts were decanted, the buildings demolished and rebuilding began, resulting, in the first district, George Street/ Canal Street, in low flats in render and reused rubble around landscaped courtyards, with a 15-storey tower at one end. As the post-war desire for urban regeneration gained momentum it would focus on the tower block, championed in Glasgow by David Gibson, convener of the city housing committee. Projects like the brutalist Red Road Flats originally offered hope of a new beginning and an escape from the overcrowded nineteenth-century tenements of the city, but lacked a sufficient infrastructure and soon deteriorated. They also made extensive use of asbestos as a fire retardant, leading to long-term health problems for builders and residents. Robert Matthew (1906–75) and Basil Spence (1907–76) were responsible for redeveloping the Gorbals in Glasgow, for demolitions at the University of Edinburgh and the stark rebuilding typified by the David Hume Tower (1960–63). The new confidence of this period can also be seen in infrastructure projects, of which the Forth Road Bridge (opened 1962) was a key example.

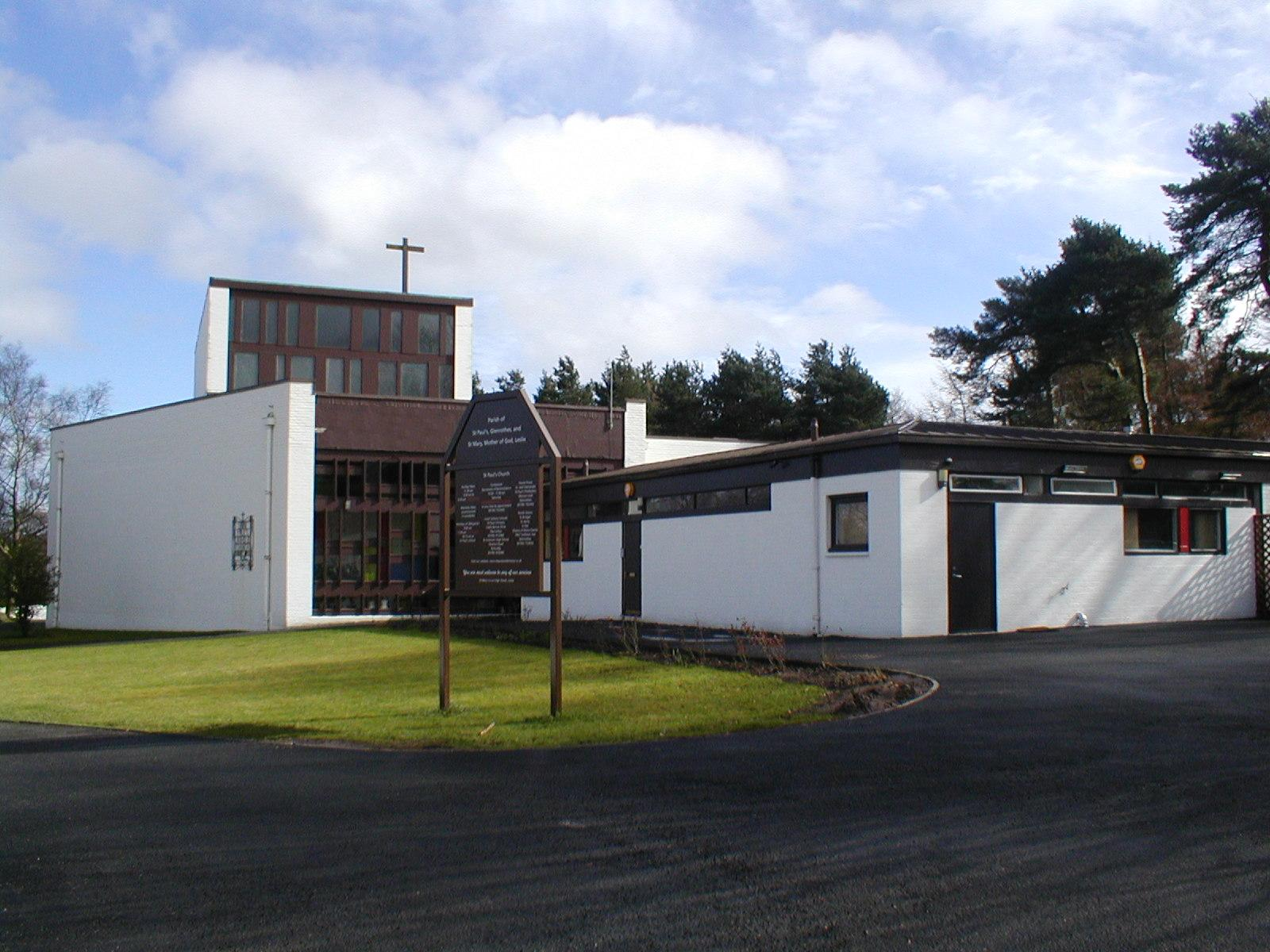
St. Paul's R.C. Church, Glenrothes, one of the first modernist churches produced by Gillespie, Kidd & Coia

Another solution adopted in Scotland was the building of new towns like Glenrothes (1948) and Cumbernauld (1956), designed to take excess population from the cities. These used a new low, dense pattern of community design, with terraced cottages and low flats. Cumbernauld was praised for its architecture when first built, but the uncompleted centre and the layout of the town in general, were receiving heavy criticism by the twenty-first century: its modernist architecture described by one resident as "the lego fantasy of an unhappy child". The brutalist tendency in comprehensive Scottish urban planning would be derided by critics for its "tabula rasa planning" and "architect's arrogance".

The creation of new towns and council house estates necessitated the rapid supply of new churches. The austerity, shortage of materials and need for rapid building, discouraged the development of innovative design. This was accompanied by the rejection by most architects of traditional forms in favour of International Style, characterised by simple outlines, uncluttered internal spaces, absence of colour, and flat roofs. The Catholic Church, whose traditional membership was most affected by the changes in housing, was the first to react to this situation, creating 76 new parishes between 1845 and 1960 in the west of the country alone. The Baptist and Episcopalian churches followed close behind, particularly in the new towns. Within the Church of Scotland, the closeness of congregation and clergy was expressed in the domestic plainness of 1950s dual-use hall churches, as at Reiach's Kildrum Parish Church, Cumbernauld (completed 1962), a steel framed building, clad in timber and brick with a flat roof. Of 129 buildings erected by the Church of Scotland between 1948 and 1959, 108 were on this basic pattern.

== Postmodernism: 1980s to the present ==
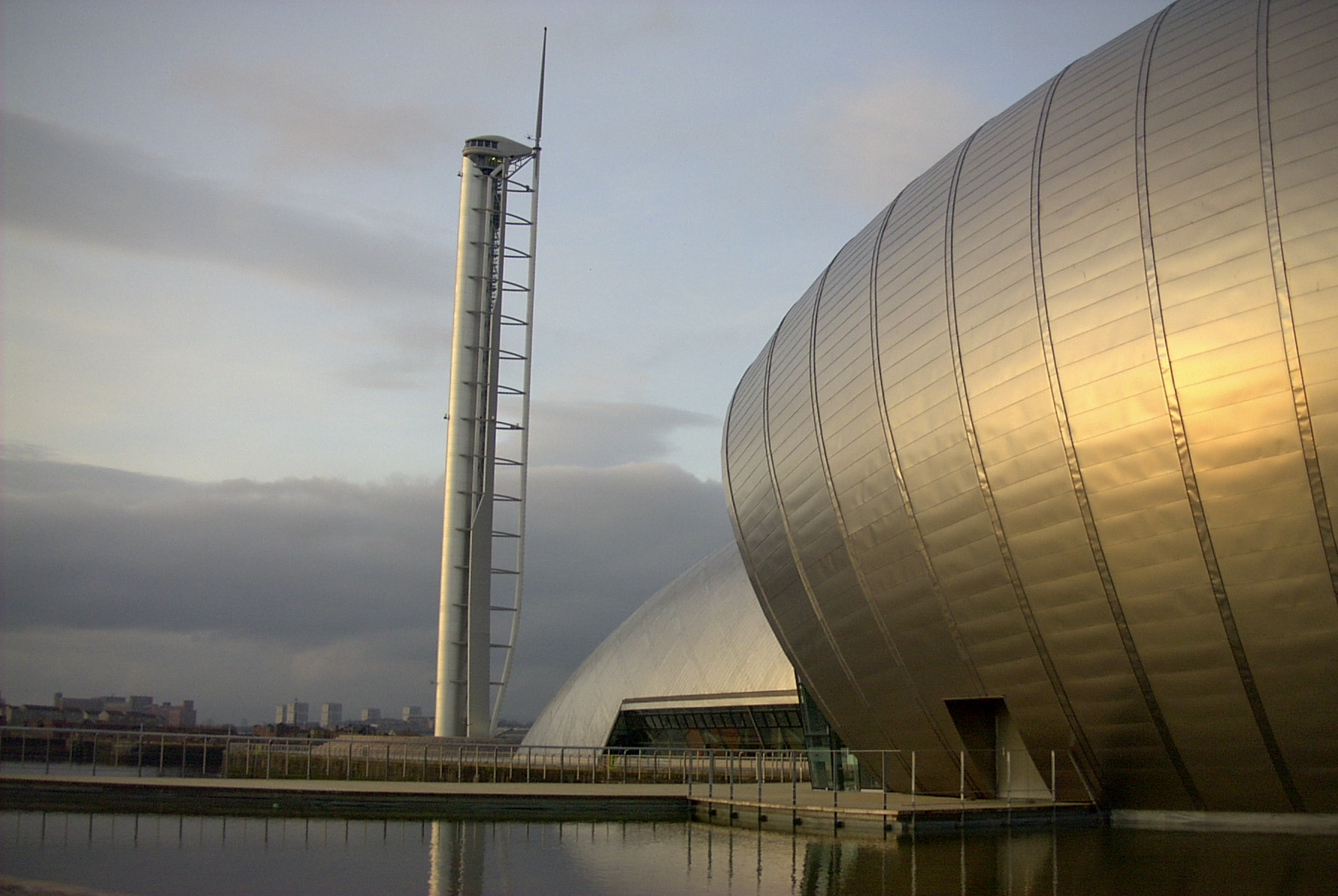
Glasgow Tower, Scotland's tallest tower, and the IMAX Cinema at the Glasgow Science Centre

From the 1980s there was a backlash against the statism and compressive nature of modernist architecture. Instead there was a move towards a form of post-modernism that looked to a clash of styles with a renewed emphasis on visual aesthetics that invoked classicism. There was also a combination of the private and the public. This movement against modernism also included renewed influence by the Scots baronial and Mackintosh-inspired designs; these can be seen respectively in the Scandic Crown Hotel (1988–89) in the Old Town in Edinburgh and the National Library Causewayside Building (1985–87, extended 1993–94). The most significant figure in the development of architecture in Scotland from the 1980s was the academic Charles McKean. He was secretary and treasurer of the Royal Incorporation of Architects in Scotland (RIAS) from 1979 to 1995. He argued against motorway expansion and the production of grey, colourless monoliths. Early private works influenced by these ideas included the D. & D. Warehouse, Centre Street and the Bank of Pakistan in Sauchiehall Street, both in Glasgow. Public structures included the building to house the Burrell Collection in Glasgow (1981) and the Glasgow Sheriff Court (1980–86).

Since the 1990s there has been a return to some elements of modernism, particularly in major public building projects. Recent major public buildings include the Scottish Exhibition and Conference Centre, Glasgow (1997), designed by Norman Foster (1935–) and known for its segmented, curving roof as "the Armadillo", and the many striking modern buildings along the side of the River Clyde, such as the Glasgow Science Centre, IMAX Cinema and Glasgow Tower (2001), which is the highest in Scotland. The most important public building of the early twenty-first century is the Scottish Parliament Building in Edinburgh, designed by Enric Miralles (1955–2000) and opened in 2004, with a design that recalls upturned fishing boats. There have been increasing attempts to preserve much of what survives from Scotland's architectural heritage, including the great buildings and monuments, but also the classically influenced houses of towns like Edinburgh and Glasgow and the surviving tenements, many of which have been renovated, restored from the black fronts created by pollution to their original pink and honeyed sandstone, and brought up to modern standards of accommodation. Urban regeneration has also been attempted in areas of post-industrial decline, like the Merchant City in Glasgow, which was returned to housing from the 1980s, with warehouse loft conversions, and, more recently, the waterfront in Edinburgh, resulting in a return of resident populations to major urban centres.

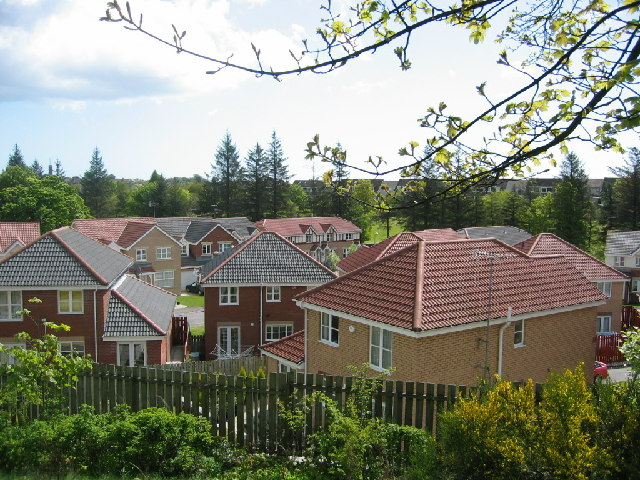
Modern housing at Woodend, Aberdeen, built in brick, half timbering can be seen in the distance

The 1980s saw the growth of speculative house building by developers. These introduced English brick and half-timbered vernacular styles to Scotland, which had been largely unknown before this period. Many were small and built to minimum standards with little regard to energy or environmental issues. Sales of council houses were popular in Scotland and until the mid-1990s as, unlike in England, local authorities could use the whole of their capital receipts for development. Under the Scottish Assembly, Scottish Homes was abolished and replaced by Communities Scotland in 2001, which had a responsibility to provide affordable housing and environmental improvement. In 2011 it was in turn replaced by the Scottish Housing Regulator, whose remit includes Scottish local authority landlords.

As the production of state sponsored housing subsided in the 1970s, there was a return to conservatism in church design, which may have reflected a loss of confidence in the churches as attendances rapidly declined. M. Glendinning, R. MacInnes and A. MacKechnie have identified a "post-Coia" style emerging in this period. The limited number of new buildings, some replacing existing churches, tended to be produced by building companies using laminated timber beams, exposed brickwork and pyramidal roofs to produce utilitarian, if aesthetically unadventurous, constructions. From the late 1980s there were some original designs, including St Mary the Virgin, in Port Glasgow (1984) by Frank Burnet, Bell and Partners; St Anthony's Catholic church in Kirriemuir (1987), by James F. Stephen Architects; and the replacement church at St Joseph's Catholic Church, Faifley (1997) by Jacobsen and French. There was also the postmodern design of St John Ogilvie Catholic Church, Irvine (1982) by Douglas Goodwin Malcolm Niven , and the nearby Girdle Toll parish church (1992), which was converted from a farmhouse.

== See also ==
- Architecture in early modern Scotland
