= Acheson House =

House in City of Edinburgh, Scotland

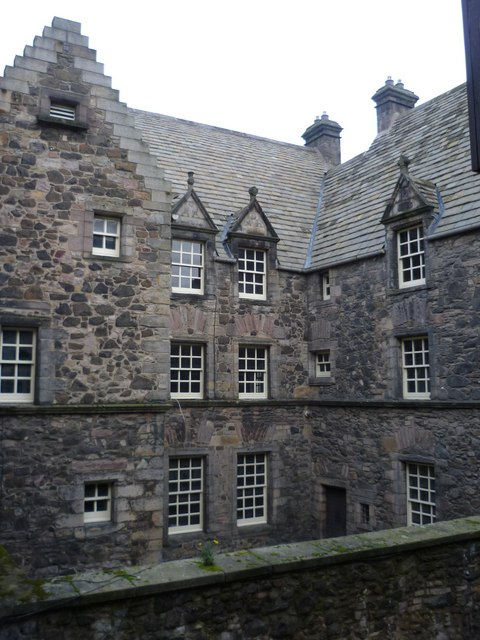

- Location of Acheson House in central Edinburgh
- 55.9512°N 3.1791°W
- Location: Canongate, Edinburgh, Scotland

History
- Built: 1633
- Built for: Sir Archibald Acheson, 1st Baronet

Listed Building – Category A
- Designated: 14 October 1970
- Reference no.: LB28446

Acheson House is a 17th-century house in the Old Town of Edinburgh, Scotland. It was built in 1633 for Sir Archibald Acheson, 1st Baronet, Secretary of State of Scotland for King Charles I. It did not stay in the Acheson family, and during the 19th century it declined like much of the Old Town. Slum clearance led the city council to acquire the building in 1924, but the Marquess of Bute bought it to have it restored during the 1930s. It was later used by church and arts groups, but was vacant between 1991 and 2011. In November 2011, Acheson House became the base for the Edinburgh World Heritage Trust. The ground floor of the building will become part of the Museum of Edinburgh, based in the adjacent Huntly House.

The house is on the Canongate, the lower part of the Royal Mile, and is protected as a category A listed building as an "outstanding example of a large, early 17th century Scottish townhouse."

== History ==
Sir Archibald Acheson (c.1580–1634) was a Scottish lawyer who emigrated to Ireland in 1610. He maintained his position in Scotland however, serving as a member of the Parliament of Scotland in 1625, and being appointed a Lord of Session in 1627. Some time before 1634 he held the office of Secretary of State, Scotland in the government of Charles I.

Sir Archibald and his wife, Margaret Hamilton, built Acheson House in 1633, but he may never have lived there, dying the following year. In 1636 the house was sold to Edinburgh merchant Patrick Wood. It passed through many owners, including the Incorporation of Bakers in 1784. The house was subdivided in the 18th century. A brothel had been established in the house by the early 19th century. Between 1830 and 1924 it was owned by the Slater family.

In the 20th century, declining living standards in the Old Town prompted widespread slum clearance. In preparation for this, Acheson House was bought by the city council, but the house came to the attention of the 4th Marquess of Bute, a keen antiquarian who also supported the restoration of Gladstone's Land and houses on Charlotte Square. Lord Bute purchased the house in 1935, and commissioned architect Robert Hurd to carry out an extensive but sympathetic restoration. In 1938 it was suggested that the house could become the official residence of the Secretary of State for Scotland, but the following year it was acquired by the Canongate Kirk and was used by the Iona Community, an ecumenical group. Between 1947 and 1951 an educational book publisher and his wife and five children used it as their family home. From 1951 it became the Scottish Craft Centre, a showcase for contemporary Scottish craftwork. The Craft Centre closed in 1991, and the building was empty for 20 years. It was added to the Buildings at Risk Register for Scotland in 2000. By 2007 plans had been prepared to incorporate the building into the Museum of Edinburgh, located in Huntly House, next door to Acheson House on the Canongate. During 2011 the house was renovated, and in November the Edinburgh World Heritage Trust moved into the building from its previous base at 5 Charlotte Square.

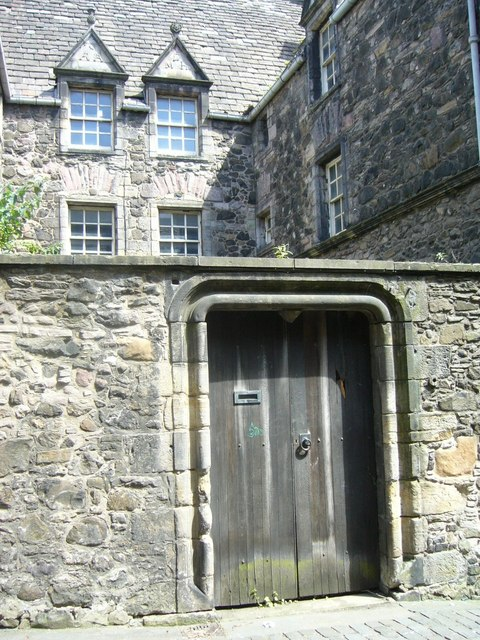
Bakehouse Close gateway

== Description ==
The three-storey L-plan house faces the Canongate to the north, and Bakehouse Close to the west. The house is set back from the Canongate, with a small forecourt entered via a timber door. Formerly located in Anchor Close, the stone lintel above this door is inscribed "O Lord In Thee Is All My Traist". The gateway from Bakehouse Close was brought from Carberry Tower in East Lothian in the 1930s restoration. Above the door to the stair-tower the date 1633 is carved, together with the initials of Archibald Acheson and Margaret Hamilton, and the Acheson family crest: a cock and trumpet. The forecourt garden is to be restored as part of the renovation of the house.
