= University of St Andrews =

Public university in St Andrews, Fife, Scotland

- Coat of arms
- Latin: Universitas Sancti Andreae apud Scotos
- Motto: Ancient Greek: Αἰὲν ἀριστεύειν (Aien aristeuein)
- Motto in English: Ever to Excel or Ever to be the Best
- Type: Public research university Ancient university
- Established: 1413; 613 years ago
- Affiliations: ACU; EUA; Europaeum; GUSI; UArctic; Universities Scotland; Universities UK; Wallace Group
- Endowment: £139.9 million (2025)
- Budget: £339.9 million (2024/25)
- Chancellor: Dame Anne Pringle
- Rector: Arthur Bernhoff
- Principal and Vice-Chancellor: Dame Sally Mapstone
- Academic staff: 1,340 (2024/25)
- Administrative staff: 1,915 (2024/25)
- Students: 11,645 (2024/25); 10,800 FTE (2024/25)
- Undergraduates: 9,180 (2024/25)
- Postgraduates: 2,460 (2024/25)
- Location: St Andrews, Fife, Scotland, UK
- Campus: University town
Colours
United College, St Andrews
St Mary's College
School of Medicine
St Leonard's College
- Website: st-andrews.ac.uk

The University of St Andrews (Scots: University o St Andras, Scottish Gaelic: Oilthigh Chill Rìmhinn; abbreviated as St And in post-nominals (Note: from the Latin Sancti Andreae)) is a public research university in the town of St Andrews in Scotland. It is the oldest of the four ancient universities of Scotland and, following the universities of Oxford and Cambridge, the third-oldest university in the English-speaking world. St Andrews was founded in 1413 when the Antipope Benedict XIII issued a papal bull to a small founding group of Augustinian clergy. Along with the universities of Glasgow, Aberdeen, and Edinburgh, St Andrews was part of the Scottish Enlightenment during the 18th century.

St Andrews is made up of a variety of institutions, comprising three colleges – United College (a union of St Salvator's and St Leonard's Colleges), St Mary's College, and St Leonard's College, the last named being a non-statutory revival of St Leonard's as a post-graduate society. There are 18 academic schools organised into four faculties. The university spans both historic and contemporary buildings scattered across the town. The academic year is divided into two semesters, Martinmas and Candlemas. In term time, over one-third of the town's population are either staff members or students of the university. The student body is known for preserving ancient traditions such as Raisin Weekend, May Dip, and the wearing of distinctive academic dress.

The student body is also notably diverse: over 145 nationalities are represented with about 45% of its intake from countries outside the UK; a tenth of students are from Europe with the remainder from the rest of the world – 20% from North America alone. Undergraduate admissions are among the most selective in the country, with the university having the third-lowest offer rate for 2022 entry (behind only Oxford and Cambridge) and the highest entry standards of new students, as measured by UCAS entry tariff, at 215 points.

St Andrews has many notable alumni and affiliated faculty, including eminent mathematicians, scientists, theologians, philosophers, and politicians. Recent alumni include the former first minister of Scotland Alex Salmond; former Cabinet Secretary Mark Sedwill; former Chief of the Secret Intelligence Service (MI6) Alex Younger; Olympic cycling gold medalist Chris Hoy; Permanent Representative of the United Kingdom to the United Nations Dame Barbara Woodward; and royals William, Prince of Wales, and Catherine, Princess of Wales. Five Nobel laureates are among St Andrews' alumni and former staff: three in Chemistry and two in Physiology or Medicine.

== History ==
=== Foundation ===
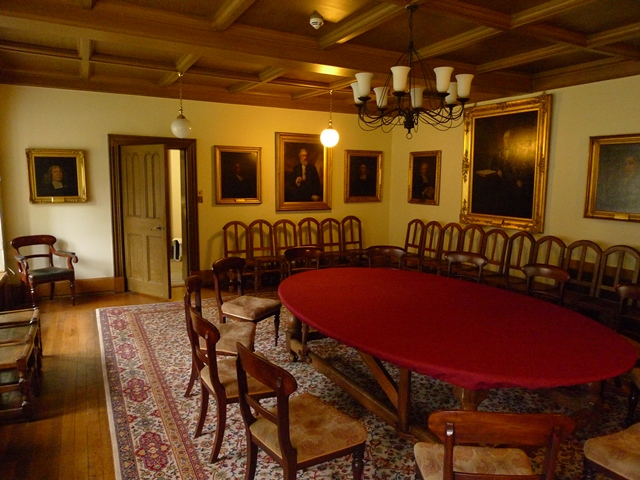
College Hall, within the 16th-century St Mary's College building

In 1410, a group of Augustinian clergy, driven from the University of Paris by the Avignon schism and from the universities of Oxford and Cambridge by the Anglo-Scottish Wars, formed a society of higher learning in St Andrews, offering courses of lectures in divinity, logic, philosophy, and law. A charter of privilege was bestowed upon the society of masters and scholars by the Bishop of St Andrews, Henry Wardlaw, on 28 February 1411–12. Wardlaw then successfully petitioned the Avignon Pope Benedict XIII to grant the school university status by issuing a series of papal bulls, which followed on 28 August 1413. King James I of Scotland confirmed the charter of the university in 1432. Subsequent kings supported the university, with King James V of Scotland "confirming privileges of the university" in 1532.

A college of theology and arts, called St John's College, was founded in 1418 by Robert of Montrose and Lawrence of Lindores. St Salvator's College was established in 1450 by Bishop James Kennedy. St Leonard's College was founded in 1511 by Archbishop Alexander Stewart, who intended it to have a far more monastic character than either of the other colleges. St John's College was refounded by Cardinal James Beaton under the name St Mary's College in 1538 for the study of divinity and law. It was intended to encourage traditional Catholic teachings in opposition to the emerging Scottish Reformation, but once Scotland had formally split with the Papacy in 1560, it became a teaching institution for Protestant clergy. At its foundation in 1538 St Mary's was intended to be a college for instruction in divinity, law, and medicine, as well as in Arts, but its career on this extensive scale was short-lived. Under a new foundation and erection, confirmed by Parliament in 1579, it was set apart for the study of Theology, and it has remained a Divinity College ever since.

Some university buildings that date from this period are still in use today, such as St Salvator's Chapel, St Leonard's College Chapel and St Mary's College quadrangle. At this time, the majority of the teaching was of a religious nature and was conducted by clerics associated with St Andrews Cathedral.

=== Development ===
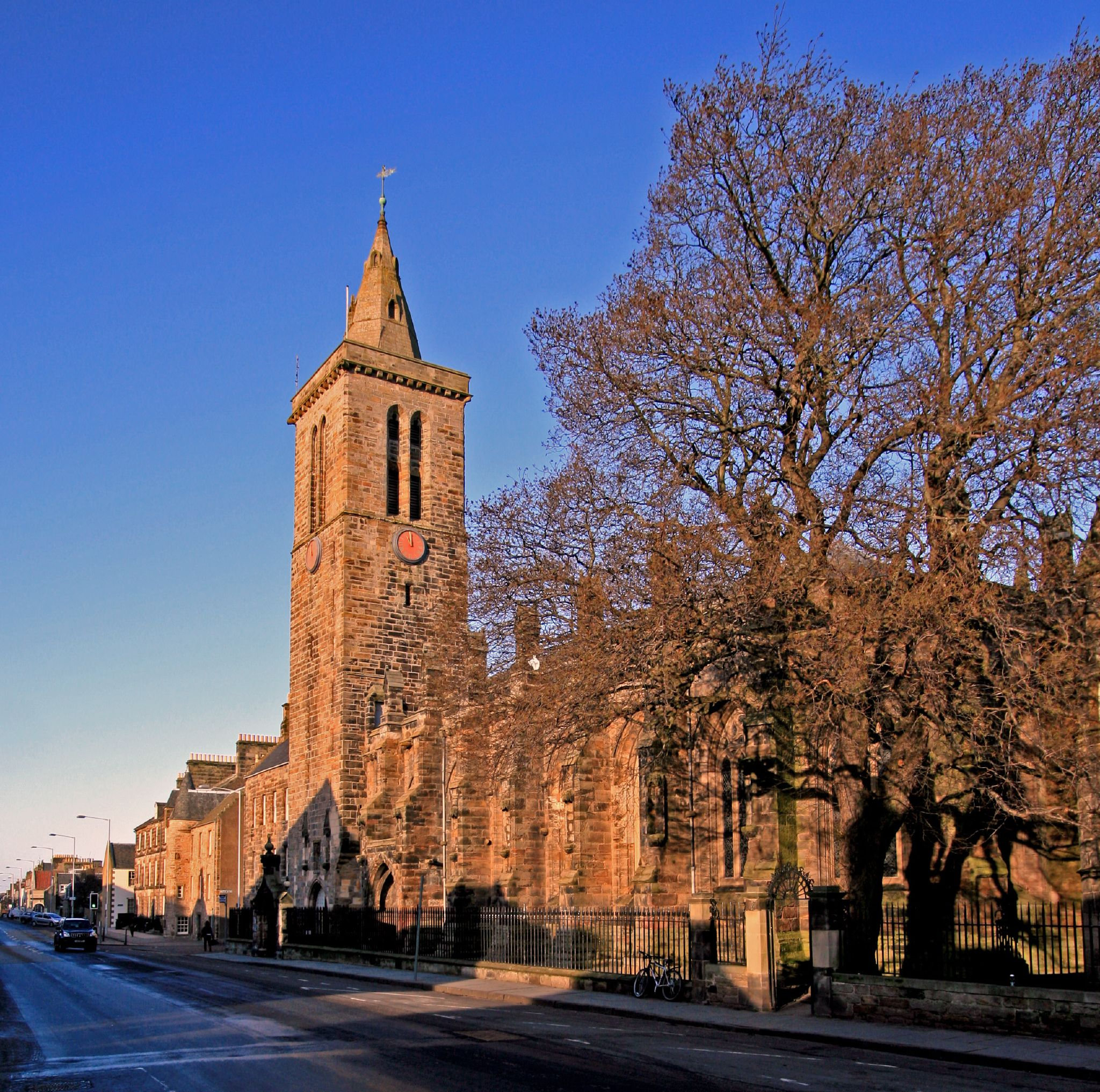
St Salvator's Chapel

During the 17th and 18th centuries, the university had mixed fortunes and was often beset by civil and religious disturbances. In a particularly acute depression in 1747, severe financial problems triggered the dissolution of St Leonard's College, whose properties and staff were merged into St Salvator's College to form the United College of St Salvator and St Leonard. Throughout this period student numbers were very low; for instance, when Samuel Johnson visited the university in 1773, the university had fewer than 100 students, and was in his opinion in a steady decline. He described it as "pining in decay and struggling for life". The poverty of Scotland during this period also damaged St Andrews, as few were able to patronise the university and its colleges, and with state support being improbable, the income they received was scarce.

=== Modern period ===
==== Women ====
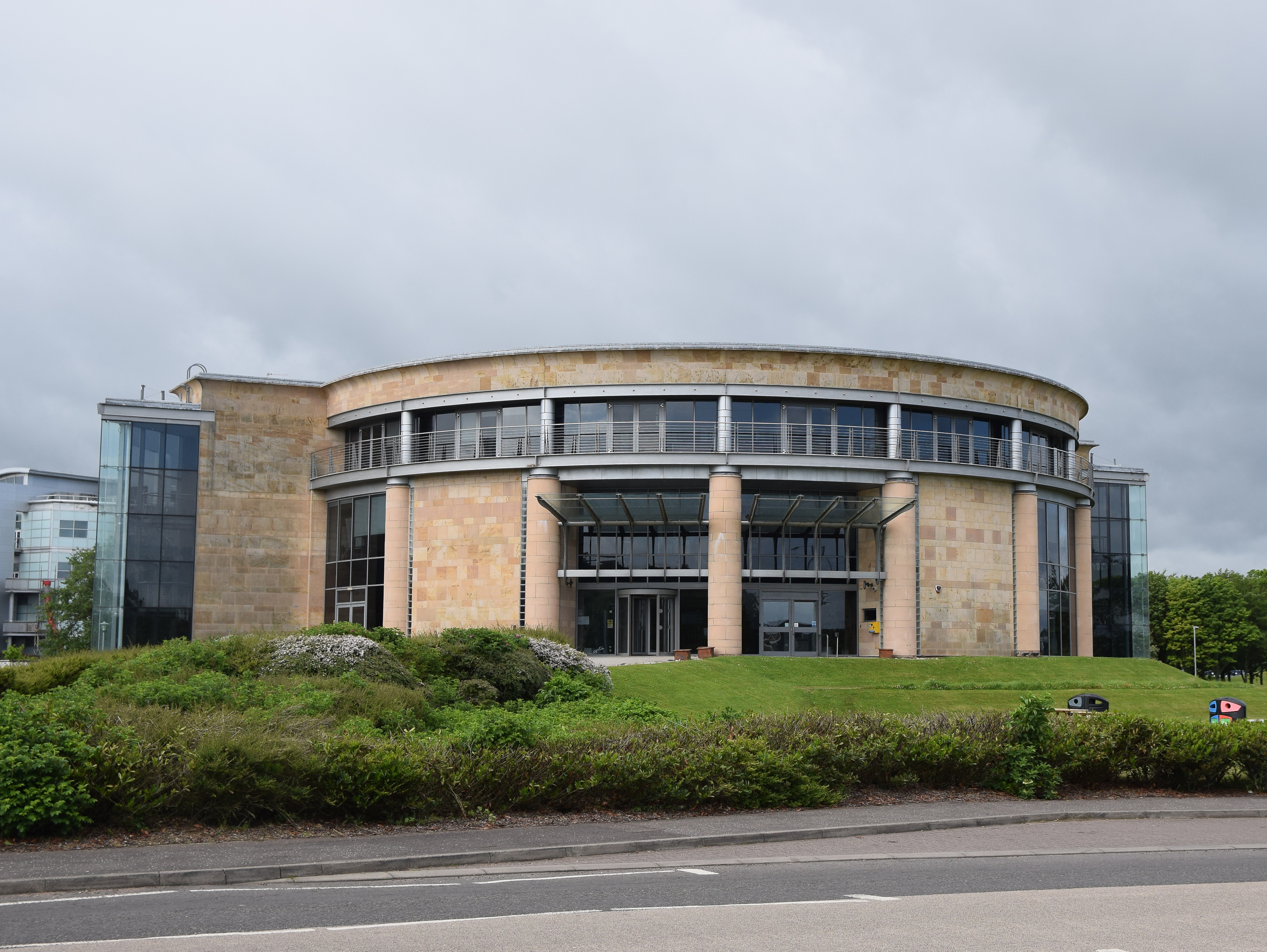
The Gateway building, built in 2000 as an International Golf Club and now used by the university's Department of Management

In the second half of the 19th century, pressure was building on universities to open up higher education to women. In 1876, the university senate decided to allow women to receive an education at St Andrews at a level roughly equal to the Master of Arts degree that men were able to take at the time. The scheme came to be known as the 'LLA examination' (Lady Literate in Arts). It required women to pass five subjects at an ordinary level and one at honours level and entitled them to hold a diploma from the university. Not being required to attend the university in person, the women were learning by correspondence, taking as many years as needed to complete the course. They were both examined and assisted in their studies by educationalists in the town or city in which they lived in the UK or abroad.

In 1889, the Universities (Scotland) Act made it possible to admit women to St Andrews formally and to receive an education equal to that of male students. In September 1892, the university was reported as having "lately taken the lead in opening its classes to women" and proclaimed that "St Andrews hails a ladies' school – St Leonards – second to none in the land, and probably second to few in England". By 1892, the headmistress of St Leonard's Ladies School, Dame Frances Dove, had become "possessor" of the buildings of the university's old St Leonard's College which were being used again for their original purpose of providing accommodation for students, only this time not for males but for "girl graduates and undergraduates".

Having matriculated, Agnes Forbes Blackadder entered the university in 1892 and became the first woman to graduate from St Andrews on the same level as men on 29 March 1895, when she gained her MA. The first female lecturer at the university was Alice Marion Umpherston, appointed in 1896 to teach Physiology to women students. In response to the increasing number of female students attending the university, the first women's hall of residence was founded in 1896 by Dame Louisa Lumsden, the first principal of St Leonards School, which adjoined the university. The residence was named University Hall.

==== Dundee ====
Until the start of the 20th century, St Andrews offered a traditional education based on classical languages, divinity and philosophical studies, and was slow to embrace more practical fields such as science and medicine that were becoming more popular at other universities. In response to the need for modernisation and in order to increase student numbers and alleviate financial problems, the university had, by 1883, established a university college in Dundee which formally merged with St Andrews in 1897. From its inception, the Dundee college had a focus on scientific, and professional subjects; the college's mixed sexes read Classics and English at St Andrews. The union was fraught with difficulties; in 1894, The Educational Times reported in the article The Quarrel between St Andrews and Dundee that University College, Dundee was "forbidden" to give such instruction in the Arts "as he [the Dundee student] might require". After the incorporation of University College Dundee, St Andrews' various problems generally receded. For example, it was able to offer medical degrees. Until 1967, many students who obtained a degree from the University of St Andrews had in fact spent most, and sometimes all, of their undergraduate career based in Dundee.

In 1967, the union with Queen's College Dundee (formerly University College Dundee) ended, when it became an independent institution under the name of the University of Dundee. As a result of this, St Andrews lost its capacity to provide degrees in many areas such as Medicine, Dentistry, Law, Accountancy, and Engineering. As well as losing the right to confer the undergraduate medical degree MBChB, it was also deprived of the right to confer the postgraduate degree MD. St Andrews was eventually able to continue to offer the opportunity to study medicine through a new arrangement with the University of Manchester in England.

In 1974, the College of St Leonard was reconstituted as a postgraduate institute.

=== Links with the United States ===
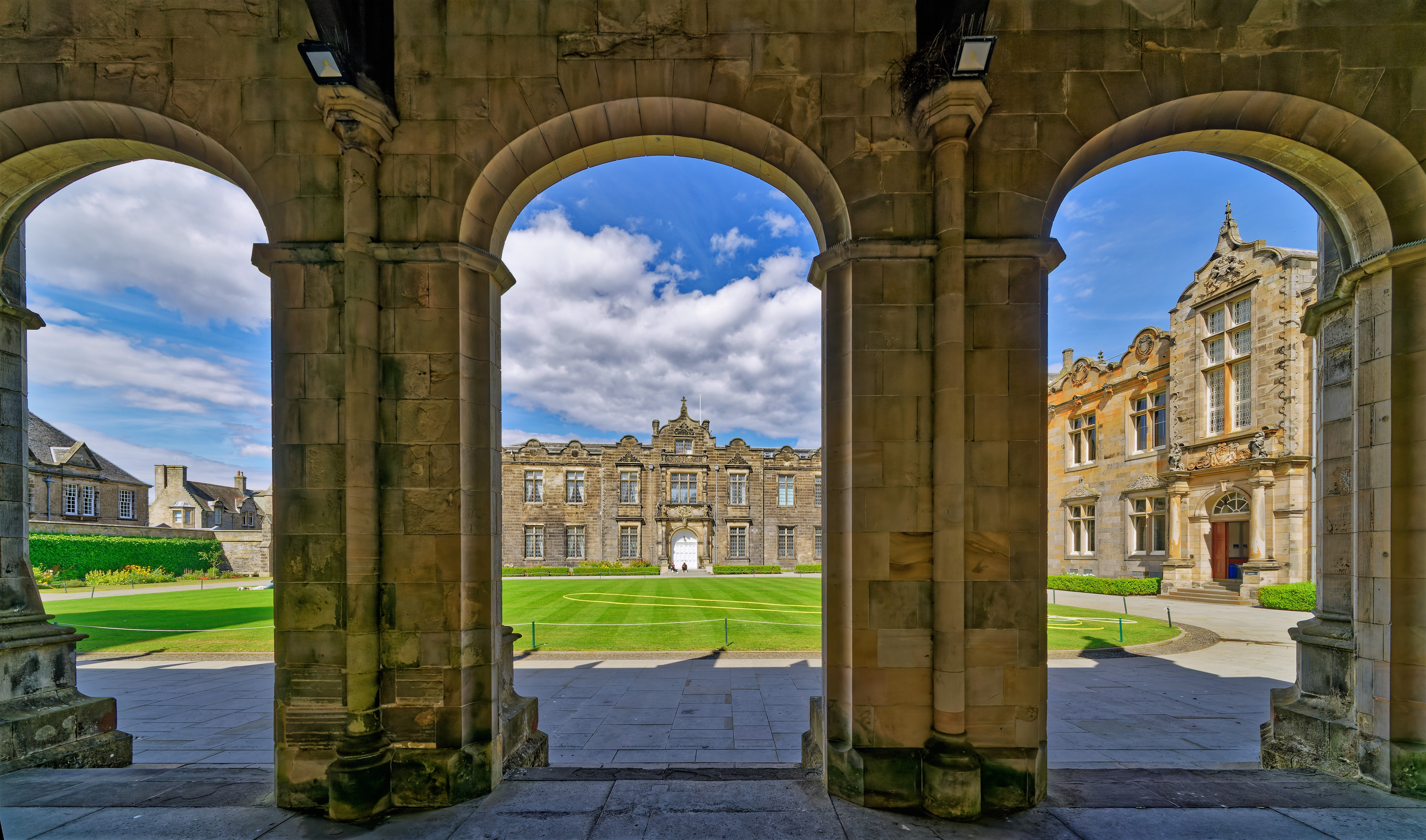
St Salvator's Quadrangle from the cloisters

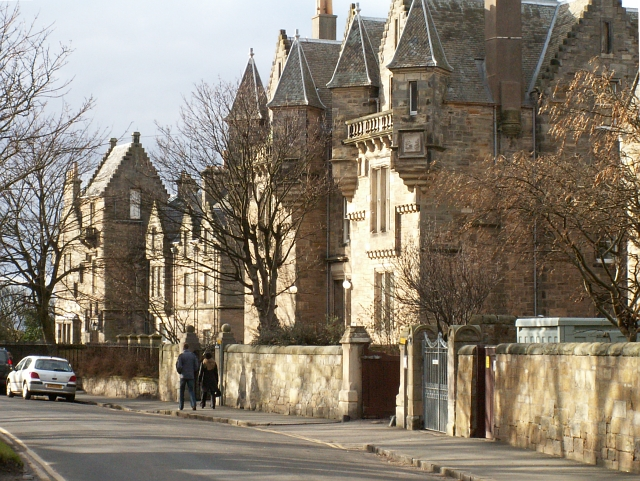
The Scores

St Andrews' historical links with the United States predate the country's independence. James Wilson, a signer of the Declaration of Independence, attended (but did not graduate from) St Andrews. Wilson was one of six original justices appointed by George Washington to the Supreme Court of the United States and was a founder of the University of Pennsylvania Law School. Other prominent American figures associated with St Andrews include Scottish American industrialist Andrew Carnegie, who was elected Rector in 1901 and whose name is given to the prestigious Carnegie Scholarship, and Edward Harkness, an American philanthropist who in 1930 provided for the construction of St Salvator's Hall. American Bobby Jones, co-founder of the Augusta National Golf Club and the Masters Tournament, was named a Freeman of the City of St Andrews in 1958, becoming only the second American to be so honoured, the other being Benjamin Franklin in 1759. In 1976, a reciprocal scholarship programme named in honour of Jones was established between St Andrews and Emory University in Georgia, where Jones studied for his law degree.

Links with the United States have been maintained into the present day and continue to grow. In 2009, Louise Richardson, an Irish-American political scientist specialising in the study of terrorism, was drawn from Harvard to serve as the first female Principal and Vice Chancellor of St Andrews. She later went on to her next appointment as the vice chancellor to the University of Oxford.

Students from almost every state in the United States and province in Canada are represented. Active recruitment of students from North America first began in 1984, and has continued to grow steadily through partnerships with schools and counsellors, consistent in-country engagements, and active support from alumni. Since at least 2014, St Andrews has consistently had the largest share of US students among British universities, with Americans making up roughly a fifth of the student body in 2024. This is the highest proportion amongst all British universities. Media reports indicate growing numbers of American students are attracted to the university's academics, traditions, prestige, internationalism, and comparatively low tuition fees. The university also regularly features as one of the few non-North American universities in the Fiske Guide to Colleges, an American college guide, as a 'Best Buy'. In 2025, British media dubbed St Andrews as a "mini-Nantucket" due to the concentration of wealthy American students from the East Coast at the university.

St Andrews has developed a sizable alumni presence in the United States, with over 8,000 alumni spread across all 50 states. Most major cities host alumni clubs, the largest of which is in New York. Both London and New York also host the St Andrews Angels, an alumni-led angel investment network, which centres upon the wider university communities in both the United Kingdom and United States. St Andrews has also established relationships with other university alumni clubs and private membership clubs in the United States to provide alumni with social and networking opportunities. For example, alumni are eligible for membership at the Princeton Club of New York, the Penn Club of New York City and the Algonquin Club in Boston.

In 2013, Hillary Clinton, former United States Secretary of State, took part in the academic celebration marking the 600th anniversary of the founding of the University of St Andrews. Clinton received an honorary degree of Doctor of Laws and provided the graduation address, in which she said,

I do take comfort from knowing there is a long tradition of Americans being warmly welcomed here at St Andrews. Every year I learn you educate more than one thousand American students, exposing them to new ideas and perspectives as well as providing them with a first-class education. I've been proud and fortunate to hire a few St Andrews alumni over the years and I thank you for training them so well.

== Governance and administration ==
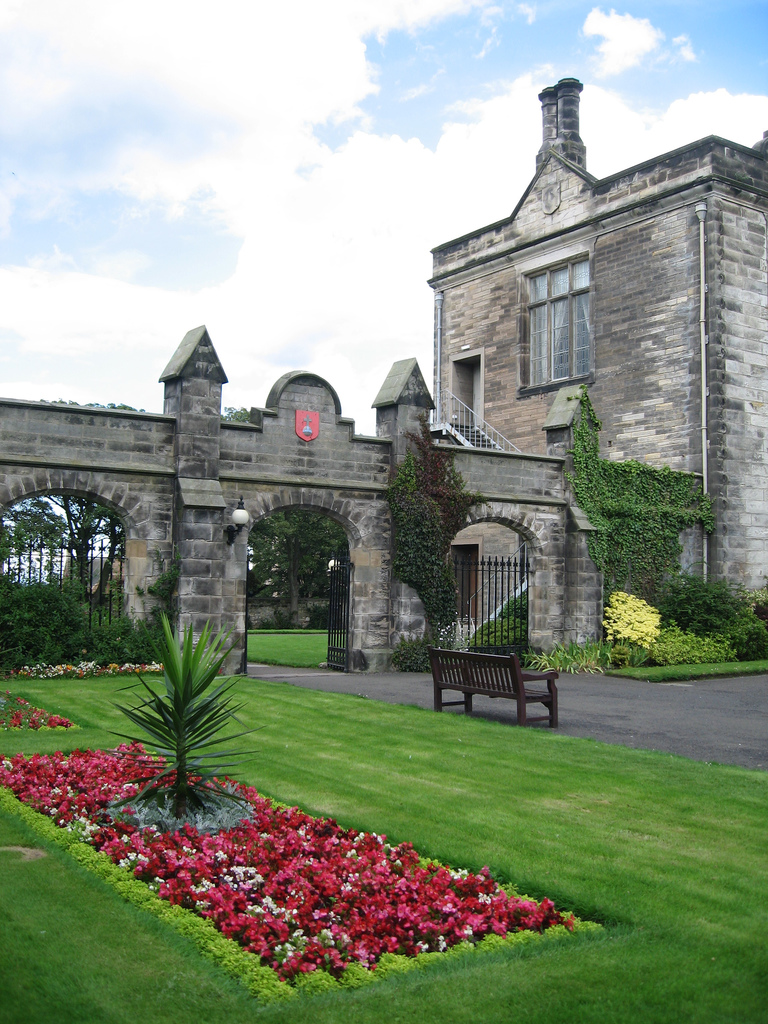
Courtyard of the United College

As with the other ancient universities of Scotland, the governance of the university is determined by the Universities (Scotland) Act 1858. This act created three bodies: the General Council, University Court and Academic Senate (Senatus Academicus).

=== General Council ===
The General Council is a standing advisory body of all the graduates, academics, and former academics of the university. It meets twice a year and appoints a business committee to manage business between these meetings. Its most important functions are to appoint two assessors to the University Court and elect the university's chancellor.

=== University Court ===
The University Court is the body responsible for administrative and financial matters and is in effect the governing body of the university. It is chaired by the rector, who is elected by the matriculated students of the university. Members are appointed by the General Council, Academic Senate and Fife Council. The president of the Students' Association and director of education are ex officio members of the court. Several lay members are also co-opted and must include a fixed number of alumni of the university.

=== Senatus Academicus ===
The Academic Senate (Latin Senatus Academicus) is the supreme academic body for the university. Its members include all the professors of the university, certain senior readers, a number of senior lecturers and lecturers, and three elected student senate representatives – one from the arts and divinity faculty, one from the science and medicine faculty and one postgraduate student. It is responsible for authorising degree programmes and issuing all degrees to graduates, and managing student discipline. The president of the Senate is the University Principal.

=== University officials ===
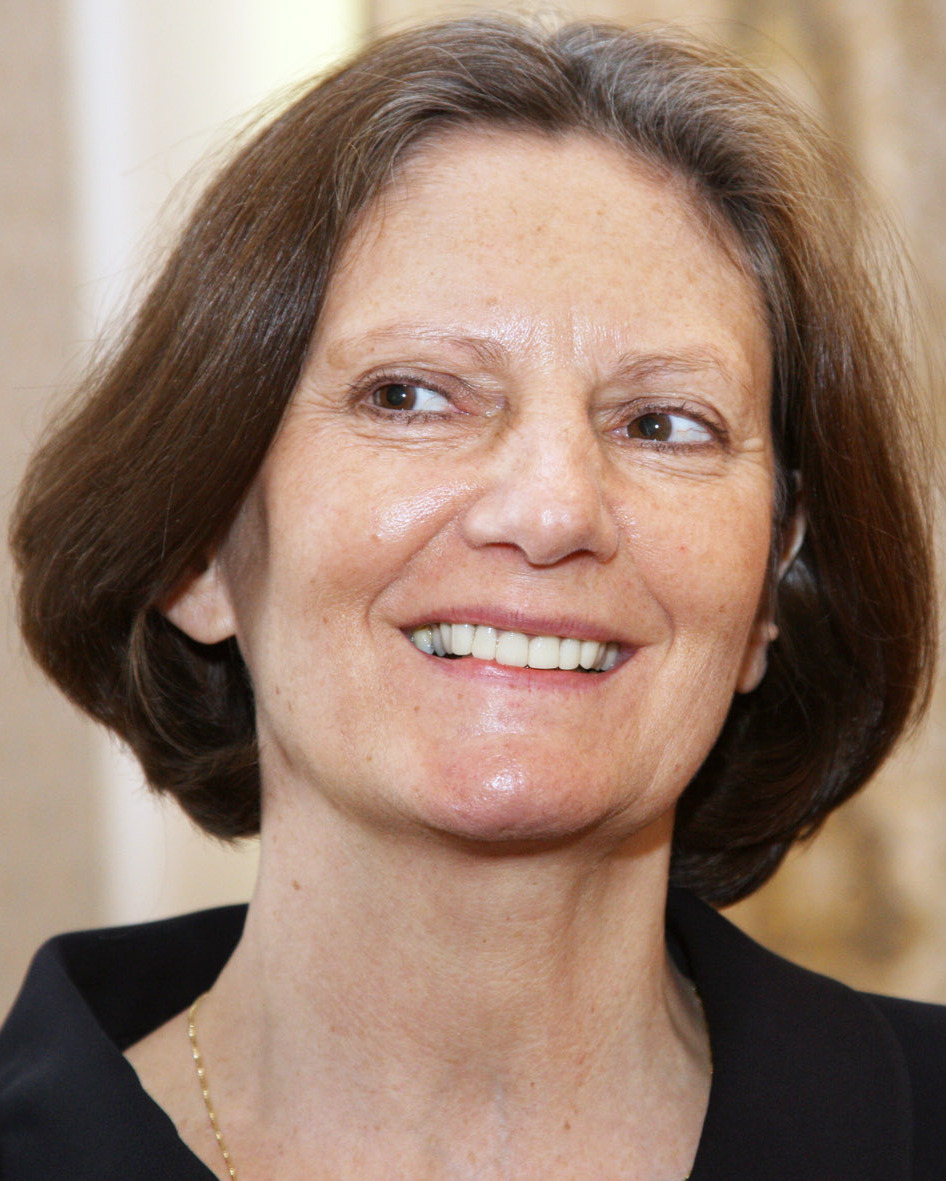
Dame Anne Pringle, current Chancellor

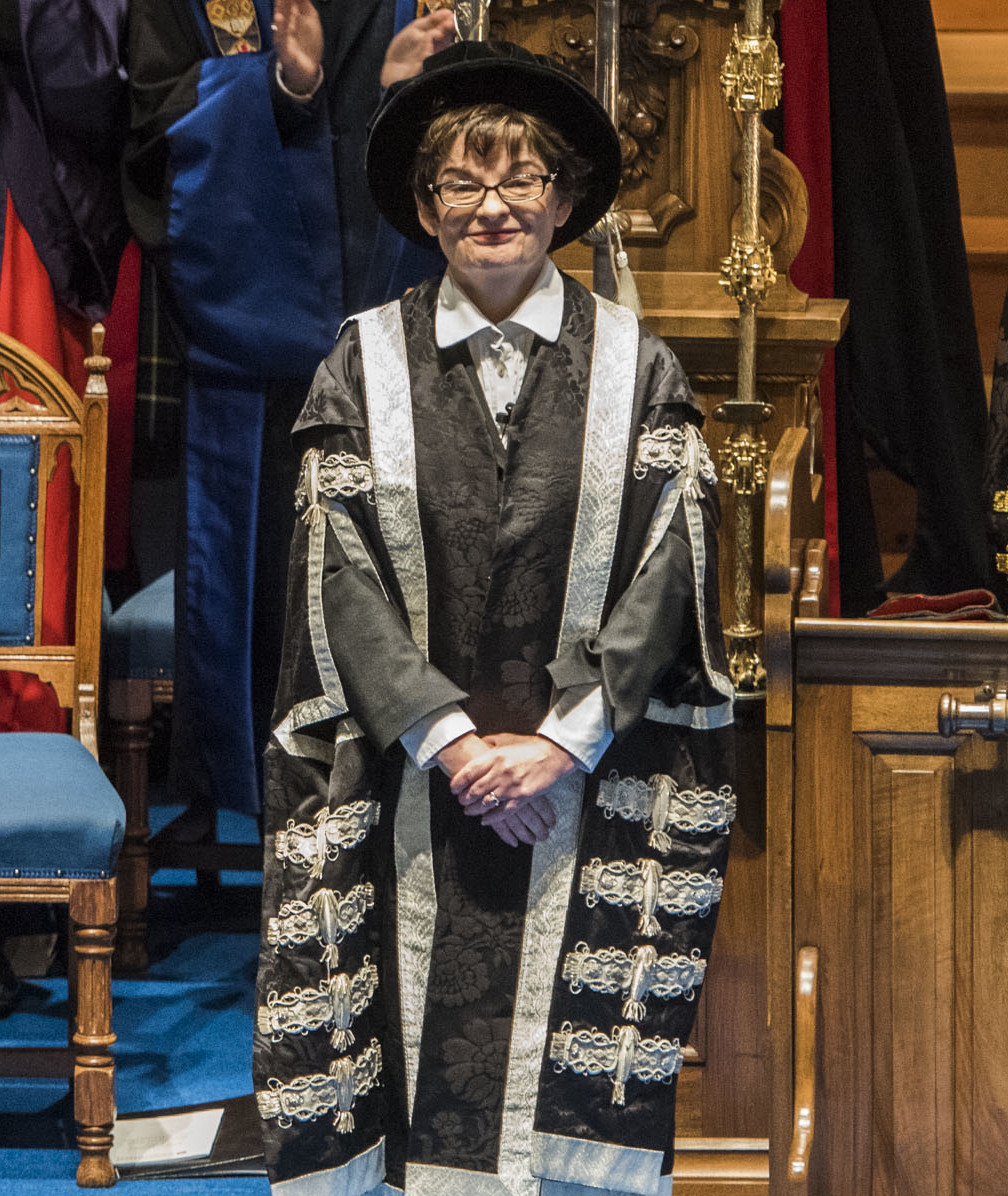
Dame Sally Mapstone, current Principal and Vice-Chancellor

The university's three most significant officials are its chancellor, principal, and rector, whose rights and responsibilities are largely derived from the Universities (Scotland) Act 1858.

The Chancellor of the University of St Andrews is the titular head of the University of St Andrews. Their duties include conferring degrees, promoting the university's image throughout the world, and furthering the university's interests worldwide.

The Principal is the chief executive of the university and is assisted in that role by several key officers, including the deputy principal, Master of the United College and Quaestor. The principal has responsibility for the overall running of the university and presides over the University Senate.

In Scotland, the position of Rector exists at the four ancient universities (St Andrews, Glasgow, Aberdeen and Edinburgh), as well as the University of Dundee. The post was made an integral part of these universities by the Universities (Scotland) Act 1889. The rector of the University of St Andrews chairs meetings of the University Court, the governing body of the university; and is elected by the matriculated student body to ensure that their needs are adequately considered by the university's leadership. Throughout St Andrews' history, several notable people have been elected to the post, including Prime Ministers Arthur Balfour and Archibald Primrose, 5th Earl of Rosebery, of the United Kingdom, and Field Marshal Jan Smuts of South Africa. Other notable rectors include the philosopher John Stuart Mill, industrialist and philanthropist Andrew Carnegie, the actor John Cleese, and authors and poets Rudyard Kipling and JM Barrie.

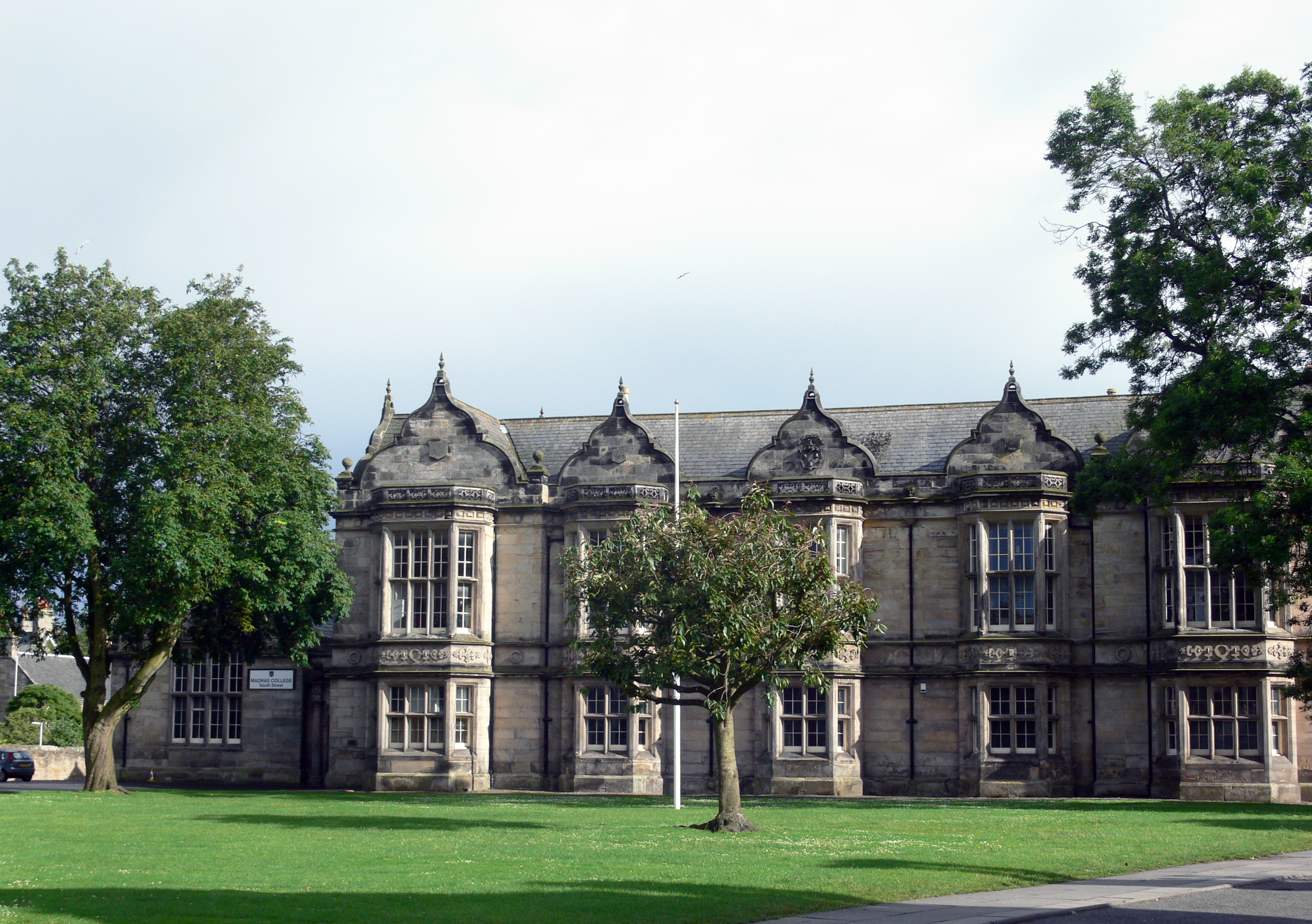
Madras College's former campus is the proposed location for New College

=== Colleges ===
The university encompasses three colleges: United College, St Mary's College and St Leonard's College. The purpose of the colleges at St Andrews is mainly ceremonial, as students are housed in separate residential halls or private accommodations. United College is responsible for all students in the faculties of arts, sciences, and medicine, and is based around St Salvator's Quadrangle. St Mary's College is responsible for all students studying in the Faculty of Divinity, and has its own dedicated site in St Mary's Quadrangle. St Leonard's College is now responsible for all postgraduate students. In 2022 the university announced its intention to create New College, a fourth college responsible for the school of International Relations and the newly formed Business School, which comprises the departments of Economics, Finance and Management. It will be located at the former site of Madras College in the town's centre, and is expected to cost £100 million.

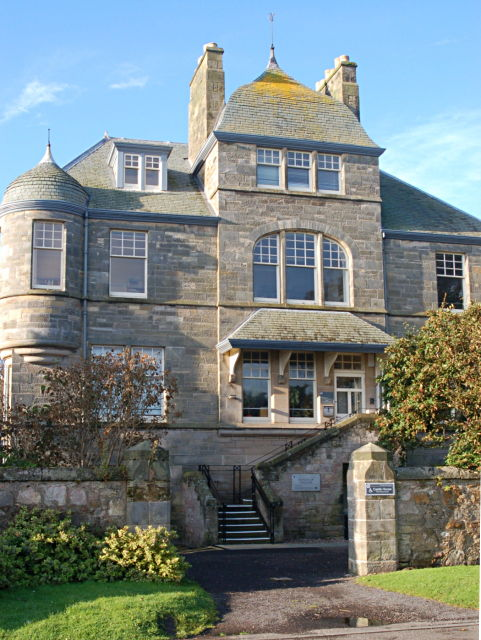
Castle House, School of English

=== Faculties and schools ===
The four academic faculties collectively encompass 18 schools. A dean is appointed by the Master of the United College to oversee the day-to-day running of each faculty. Students apply to become members of a particular faculty, as opposed to the school within which teaching is based. The faculties and their affiliated schools are:

- Faculty of Arts: art history, classics, economics, English, film studies, history, international relations, management, modern languages, philosophy, social anthropology.
- Faculty of Divinity: divinity.
- Faculty of Medicine: medicine.
- Faculty of Science: biology, chemistry, computer science, geography and sustainable development, Earth and Environmental Sciences, mathematics, physics and astronomy, psychology and neuroscience.

Certain subjects are offered within both the Faculties of Arts and Sciences, the six subjects are: economics, geography, management, mathematics, psychology, and sustainable development. The content of the subject is the same regardless of the faculty.

=== Finances ===
In the financial year ending 31 July 2024, the University of St Andrews had a total income of £310.8 million (2022/23 – £314.2 million) and total expenditure of £245.4 million (2022/23 – £293.1 million). Key sources of income included £158.7 million from tuition fees and education contracts (2022/23 – £150.7 million), £43.3 million from funding body grants (2022/23 – £43.3 million), £40.3 million from research grants and contracts (2022/23 – £46 million), £5.6 million from investment income (2022/23 – £5.5 million) and £8.8 million from donations and endowments (2022/23 – £9 million).

At year end, St Andrews had endowments of £125.9 million (2023 – £114.9 million) and total net assets of £499.6 million (2023 – £428.1 million). It holds the twelfth-largest endowment and the third-highest alumni participation rate of any university in the UK.

== Academic profile ==
=== Semesters ===
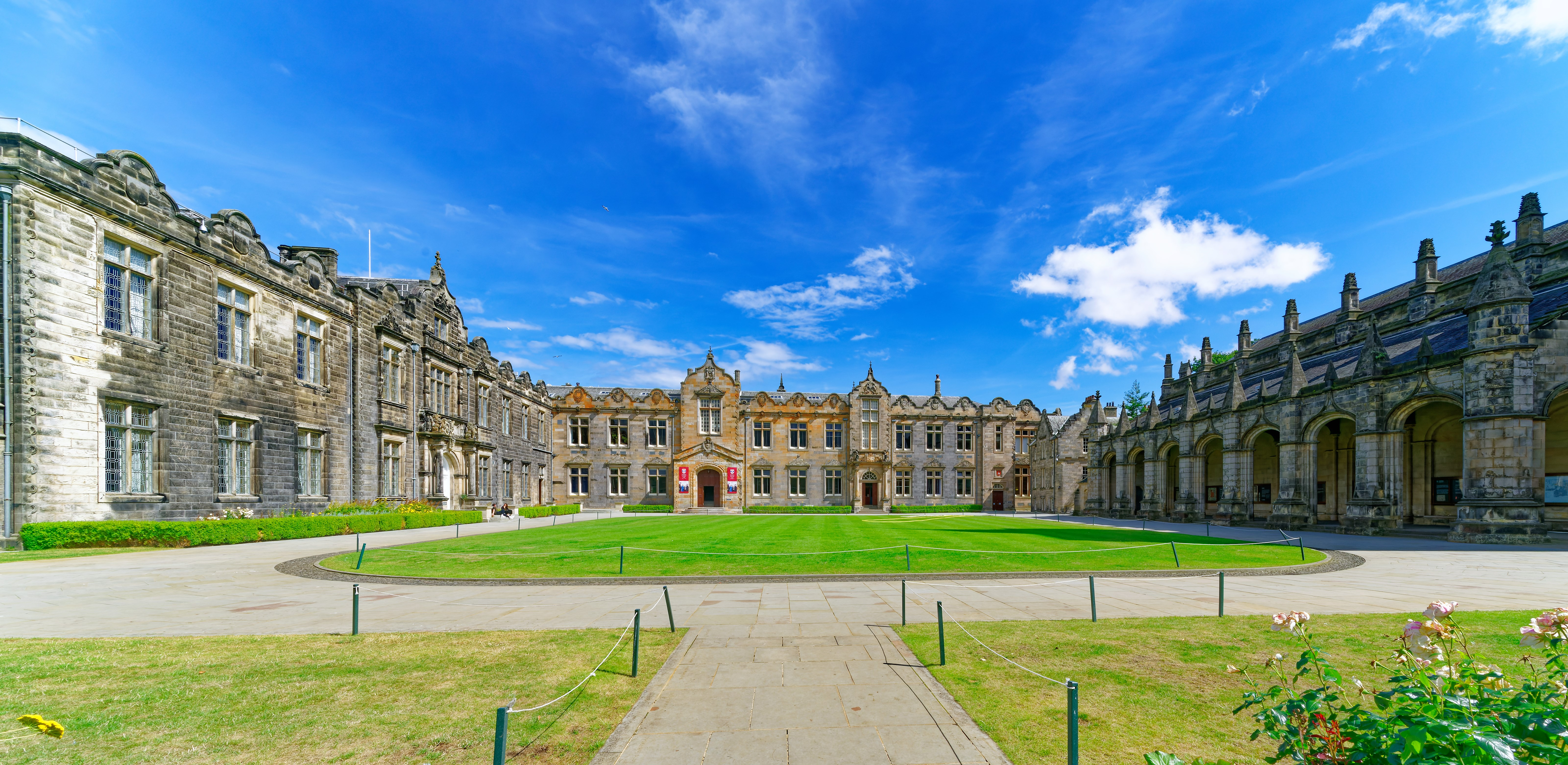
View across St Salvator's Quadrangle

The academic year at St Andrews is divided into two semesters, Martinmas and Candlemas, named after two of the four Scottish Term and Quarter Days. Martinmas, on 11 November, was originally the feast of Saint Martin of Tours, a fourth-century bishop and hermit. Candlemas originally fell on 2 February, the day of the feast of the Purification, or the Presentation of Christ. Martinmas semester runs from early September until mid-December, with examinations taking place just before the Christmas break. There follows an inter-semester period when Martinmas semester business is concluded and preparations are made for the new Candlemas semester, which starts in January and concludes with examinations in April and May. Most Undergraduate graduations are celebrated in mid-June with Postgraduate graduations being celebrated in late November.

=== Rankings and reputation ===
Rankings
National rankings
- Complete (2027): 4
- Guardian (2027): 4
- Times / Sunday Times (2027): 1

Global rankings
- ARWU (2026): 301–400
- QS (2027): 115=
- THE (2026): 162=

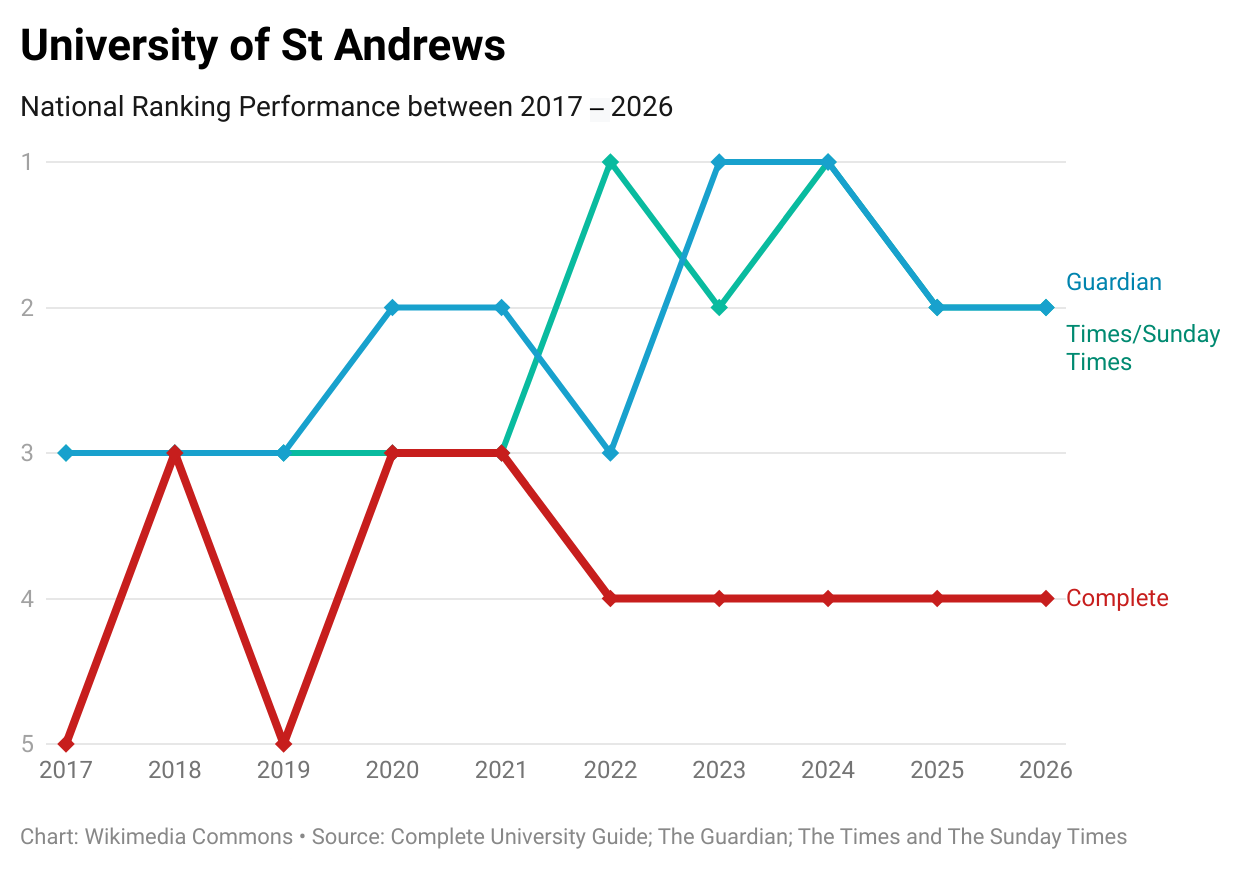
University of St Andrews' national league table performance over the past ten years

In the 2022 The Times and Sunday Times Good University Guide, St Andrews ranked as the best university in the UK, the first university to ever top Cambridge and Oxford in a British ranking. In the 2023 Guardian University Guide, St Andrews achieved the same feat and ranked first for the first time in the guide's history. In the 2024 versions of both The Guardian University Guide and The Times and Sunday Times Good University Guide, St Andrews was again ranked first in the United Kingdom. It placed first again in the 2027 The Times and Sunday Times Good University Guide. It has been twice named University of the Year by The Times and Sunday Times.

In a ranking conducted by The Guardian in 2009, St Andrews placed fifth in the UK for national reputation behind Oxford, Cambridge, Imperial and the LSE. When size is taken into account, St Andrews ranks second in the world out of all small to medium-sized fully comprehensive universities (after Brown University) using metrics from the QS Intelligence Unit in 2015. The university is ranked 5th in Europe by Times Higher Education in its 2019 Teaching Rankings. The 2021 Research Excellence Framework ranked St Andrews 16th in the UK, and second in Scotland, amongst multi-faculty institutions for the research quality (GPA) of its output profile. St Andrews was ranked ninth overall in The Sunday Times 10-year (1998–2007) average ranking of British universities based on consistent league table performance, and is one of only three universities to have never left the top 10 in any of the three main domestic league tables since 2008.

According to data released by the Department for Education in 2018, St Andrews was rated as the fifth best university in the UK for increasing male graduate earnings with male graduates seeing a 25% increase in earnings compared to the average graduate, and the ninth best university for females, with female graduates seeing a 15% increase in earnings compared to the average graduate. St Andrews is placed seventh in the UK (1st in Scotland) for the employability of its graduates as chosen by recruiters from the UK's major companies. In 2017, St Andrews was named as the university with the joint second highest graduate employment rate of any UK university (along with Warwick), with 97.7 per cent of its graduates in work or further study three and a half years after graduation. An independent report conducted by Swedish investment firm, Skandia found that despite its small undergraduate body, St Andrews is the joint-5th best university in the UK for producing millionaires. A study by High Fliers confirmed this by reporting that the university also features in the top 5 of UK universities for producing self-made millionaires. According to a study by the Institute of Employment Research, St Andrews has produced more directors of FTSE 100 companies in proportion to its size than any other educational institution in Britain.

The Times and Sunday Times Good University Guide 2026 placed eight subjects offered by St Andrews first in the UK, including: Anthropology, Chemistry, English, French, History, History of Art, Physics & Astronomy and International Relations. In the 2026 Complete University Guide, 25 out of the 26 subjects offered by St Andrews ranked within the top 5 nationally, making St Andrews one of only three multi-faculty universities in the UK to have over 95% of subjects offered in the top 10. 18 subjects ranked nationally within the top three including English (#1), German (#1), Business and Management (#2), Chemistry (#2), French (#2), Geology (#2), History of Art (#2), International Relations (#2), Italian (#2), Psychology (#2), Anthropology (#3), Classics (#3), Film Studies (#3), History (#3), Iberian Languages (#3), Mathematics (#3), Russian (#3) and Theology (#3). Biomedical Sciences (#4), Computer Science (#4), Economics (#4), Geography and Environmental Science (#4), Biological Sciences (#5), Philosophy (#5), Physics and Astronomy (#5) made up the other subjects in the top 5. The Guardian University Guide 2026 placed History, History of Art, Mathematics and International Relations first in the UK. 14 other subjects ranked nationally within the top 3 including Anthropology, Business and Management, Chemistry, Classics and Ancient History, Computer Science, Earth Science, Economics, English, Film Studies, Geography, Languages and Linguistics, Philosophy, Physics and Psychology. For the Arts and Humanities, St Andrews was ranked 35th in the world by the 2026 Times Higher Education World University Rankings and 46th by the 2026 QS World University Rankings.

=== Admissions ===
UCAS Admission Statistics
	2025	2024	2023	2022	2021
Applications (Note: Main scheme applications, International and UK)	19,050	18,520	18,740	21,680	21,405
Accepted	2,050	1,910	1,765	1,955	1,820
Applications/Accepted Ratio	9.3	9.7	10.6	11.1	11.8
Overall Offer Rate (%)	39.7	35.0	29.2	30.8	32.5
↳ UK only (%) (Note: UK domiciled applicants only)	29.4	30.0	26.6	24.7	25.0
Average Entry Tariff	—N/a	—N/a	206	215	212
↳ Top three exams (Note: The maximum tariff score for three exams is 168: the equivalent of A*A*A* at A-Level, 777 at HL for the IB Diploma Programme, or AAA at Advanced Higher)	—N/a	—N/a	155.6	161.5	162.1

HESA Student Body Composition (2024/25)
Domicile and Ethnicity	Total
British White (Note: Not be confused solely with White British)	43%
British Ethnic Minorities (Note: Includes those who indicate that they identify as Asian, Black, Mixed Heritage, Arab or any other ethnicity except White.)	11%
International EU	9%
International Non-EU	38%
Undergraduate Widening Participation Indicators
Female	62%
Independent School	31%
Low Participation Areas (Note: Calculated from the Polar4 measure, using Quintile1, in England and Wales. Calculated from the Scottish Index of Multiple Deprivation (SIMD) measure, using SIMD20, in Scotland.)	6%

The university receives applications mainly through UCAS and the Common Application with the latest figures showing that there are generally 10 applications per undergraduate place available. The university is consistently designated as a 'high-tariff' institution by the Department for Education, with the average undergraduate entrant to the university in recent years amassing between 155 and 163 UCAS Tariff points in their top three pre-university qualifications – the equivalent of A*AA to A*A*A* at A-Level. Based on 2022/23 HESA entry standards data published in domestic league tables, which include a broad range of qualifications beyond the top three exam grades, the average student at the University of St Andrews achieved 215 points, the equivalent of a fourth A* at A Level, – the highest score in the United Kingdom. According to 2022 UCAS figures, the university had an offer rate of 24.7% for undergraduate applicants – the third lowest amongst higher education institutions. For 2016–17, the acceptance rate was 8.35% and the offer rate was 22.5% for Scottish/EU applicants where places are capped by the Scottish Government. In 2017, the most competitive courses for Scottish/EU applicants were those within the Schools of International Relations, Management, and Economics and Finance with offer rates of 8.0%, 10.9% and 11.5% respectively.

In the 2024/25 academic year, the student body consisted of 11,645 students, composed of 9,180 undergraduates and 2,460 postgraduate students. The university hosts the most ethnically diverse student population out of all universities in Scotland, with 17.4% of students from an ethnic minority background and has a higher proportion of female than male students with a female ratio of 59.7% in the undergraduate population. Under 40% of the student body is from private schools and the university has one of the smallest percentages of students (13%) from lower income backgrounds, out of all higher education institutions in the UK. According to data from UCAS, St Andrews' offer rate to students from the most deprived areas (as measured by SIMD20) has increased from 28% in 2010 to 72.1% for entry in 2022, almost three times higher than the university's overall offer rate for all students. (Note: Tableau Graph WonkHe: Nicola Sturgeon's higher education legacy) The university participates in widening access schemes such as the Sutton Trust Summer School, First Chances Programme, REACH & SWAP Scotland, and Access for Rural Communities (ARC) in order to promote a more widespread uptake of those traditionally under-represented at university. In the seven-year period between 2008 and 2015, the number of pupils engaged with annual outreach programmes at the university has increased by about tenfold whilst the number of students arriving at St Andrews from the most deprived backgrounds has increased by almost 50 per cent in the past year of 2015.

=== Lecture series ===
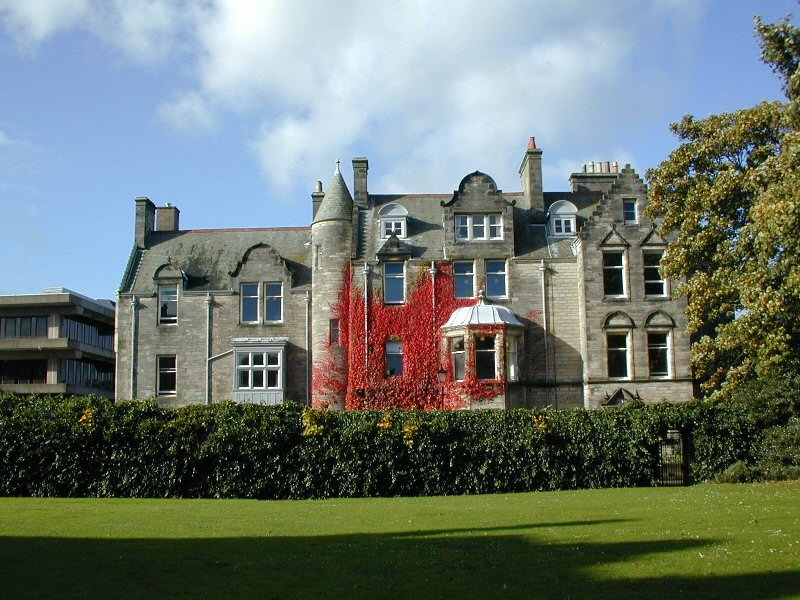
Classics Building, Swallowgate

To commemorate the university's 600th anniversary the 600th Lecture Series was commissioned in 2011, which brought diverse speakers such as former prime minister Gordon Brown, naturalist David Attenborough and linguist Noam Chomsky to St Andrews.

As part of the celebration of the 400th establishment of the King James Library, the King James Library lectures were initiated in 2009 on the subject of 'The Meaning of the Library'.

The Andrew Lang Lecture series was initiated in 1927, and named for alumnus and poet Andrew Lang. The most famous lecture in this series is that given by J. R. R. Tolkien in March 1939, entitled 'Fairy Stories', but published subsequently as 'On Fairy-Stories'.

The Computing Distinguished Lecture Series was initiated in 1969 by Jack Cole.

=== Exchange programmes ===
St Andrews has developed student exchange partnerships with universities around the globe, though offerings are largely concentrated in North America, Europe, and Asia. Exchange opportunities vary by School and eligibility requirements are specific to each exchange program.

In North America, the Bachelor of Arts International Honours program, run in conjunction with the College of William & Mary in Williamsburg, Virginia, allows students studying Classical Studies, Film Studies, International Relations, English, History, or Economics to spend two years at each institution and earn a joint degree from both. The Robert T. Jones Memorial Trust funds the Robert T. Jones Jr. Scholarship, which allows selecting St Andrews students to study, fully funded, for a year at Emory University in Atlanta, and Western University and Queen's University in Canada. The Robert Lincoln McNeil Scholarship allows students to study at the University of Pennsylvania.

One of the largest North American exchanges is with the University of California system, in which students can study at UC Berkeley, UC Los Angeles (UCLA), UC Santa Cruz (UCSC) and UC San Diego (UCSD).

Other North American partners offering multiple exchanges include the University of Virginia, the University of North Carolina at Chapel Hill, Washington University in St. Louis, Washington and Lee University, Elon University, and the University of Toronto. Some exchanges are offered within specific research institutes at St Andrews, rather than across entire Schools. For example, the Handa Centre for the Study of Terrorism and Political Violence (CSTPV), within the School of International Relations, offers student exchanges in partnership with the School of Foreign Service at Georgetown University.

St Andrews participates in the Erasmus Programme and has direct exchanges with universities across Europe. For example, in France exchanges are offered at the Sorbonne, Sciences Po, and University of Paris VI. In the Netherlands, students can study at Leiden University and Utrecht University. Narrower exchanges include those with the University of Copenhagen, the University of Oslo, and Trinity College Dublin. Exchanges are also available for postgraduate research students, such as the opportunity for social scientists to study at the European University Institute in Florence, Italy.

More recently, St Andrews has developed exchanges with partners in Asia and Oceania. Notable partners include the University of Hong Kong, Hong Kong University of Science and Technology and National University of Singapore in Asia; the University of Auckland, Australian National University and the University of Melbourne in Oceania.

== Buildings, collections and facilities ==
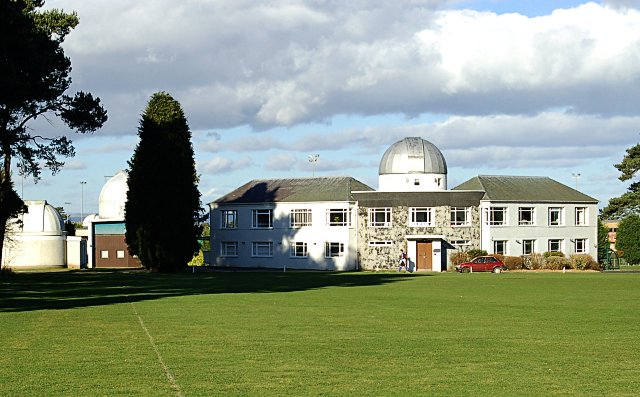
Observatory of the university

The University of St Andrews is situated in the small town of St Andrews in rural Fife, Scotland. The university has teaching facilities, libraries, student housing and other buildings spread throughout the town. Generally, university departments and buildings are concentrated on North Street, South Street, The Scores, and the North Haugh. The university has two major sites within the town. The first is the United College, St Andrews (also known as the Quad or St Salvator's) on North Street, which functions both as a teaching space and venue for student events, incorporating the Departments of Social Anthropology and Modern Languages. The second is St Mary's College, St Andrews, based on South Street, which houses the Schools of Divinity, Psychology and Neuroscience, as well as the King James Library. Several schools are located on The Scores including Classics, English, History, Philosophy, the School of Economics and Finance, and International Relations, as well as the Admissions department, the Museum of the University of St Andrews, and the principal's residence, University House. North Street is also the site of several departments, including the principal's office, Younger Hall, the Department of Film Studies, and the University Library. The North Haugh is principally home to the Natural Sciences such as Chemistry, Physics, and Biology, as well as Mathematics, Computer Science, Medicine, and the Department of Management.

=== Libraries and museums ===
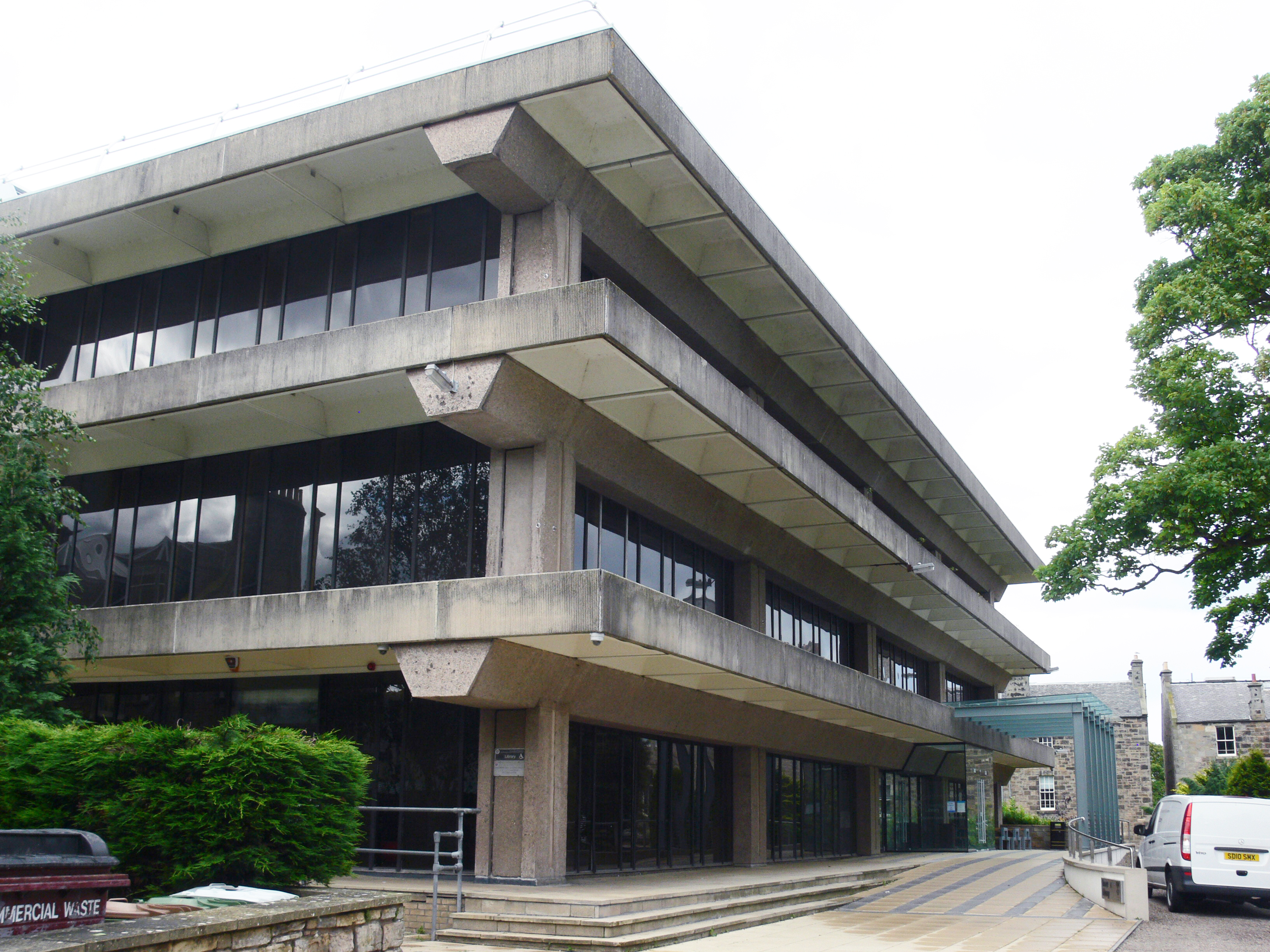
St Andrews University library building

The University of St Andrews maintains one of the most extensive university library collections in the United Kingdom, which includes significant holdings of books, manuscripts, muniments, and photographs. The library collection contains over a million volumes and over two hundred thousand rare and antique books.

The university library was founded by King James VI in 1612, with the donation of 350 works from the royal collection, at the urging of George Gledstanes, the then chancellor of St Andrews, although the libraries of the colleges of St Leonard's College, St Salvator's College and St Mary's College had existed prior to this. From 1710 to 1837 the library functioned as a legal deposit library, and as a result has an extensive collection of 18th-century literature.

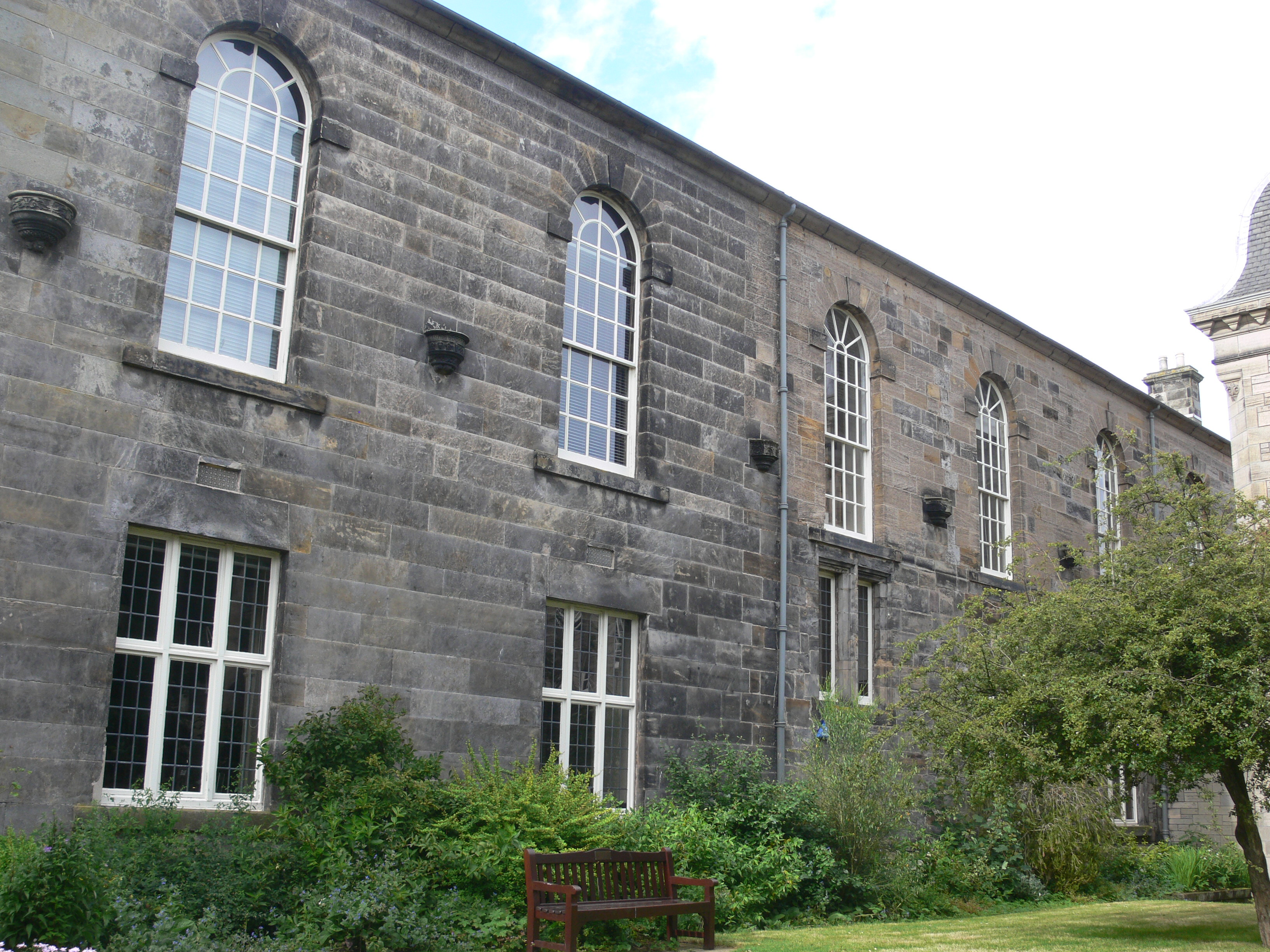
King James Library

The library's main building is located on North Street, and houses over 1,000,000 books. The library was designed by the architects Faulkner-Brown Hendy Watkinson Stonor based in North East England at Killingworth. Faulkner-Brown specialised in libraries and leisure facilities and also designed the National Library of Canada in Ottawa and the Robinson Library at Newcastle University In 2011 the main library building underwent a £7 million re-development. The historic King James library, built in 1643, houses the university's Divinity and Medieval history collections.

In 2012 the university purchased the vacant Martyrs' Kirk on North Street, with the purpose of providing reading rooms for the Special Collections department and university postgraduate research students and staff.

The university maintains several museums and galleries, open free to the public. The Museum of the University of St Andrews (MUSA) opened in 2008 and displays some highlights of the university's extensive collection of over 100,000 artefacts. It displays objects relating both to the history of the university, such as its collection of 15th-century maces, and also unrelated objects, such as paintings by John Opie, Alberto Morrocco and Charles Sims. Several of the university's collections have been recognised as being of 'national significance for Scotland' by Museums Galleries Scotland.

The Bell Pettigrew Museum houses the university's natural history collections. Founded in 1912, it is housed in the old Bute Medical School Building in St. Mary's Quad. Among its collections are the remains of several extinct species such as the dodo and Tasmanian tiger as well as fossilised fish from the nearby Dura Den, Fife, which when found in 1859 stimulated the debate on evolution.

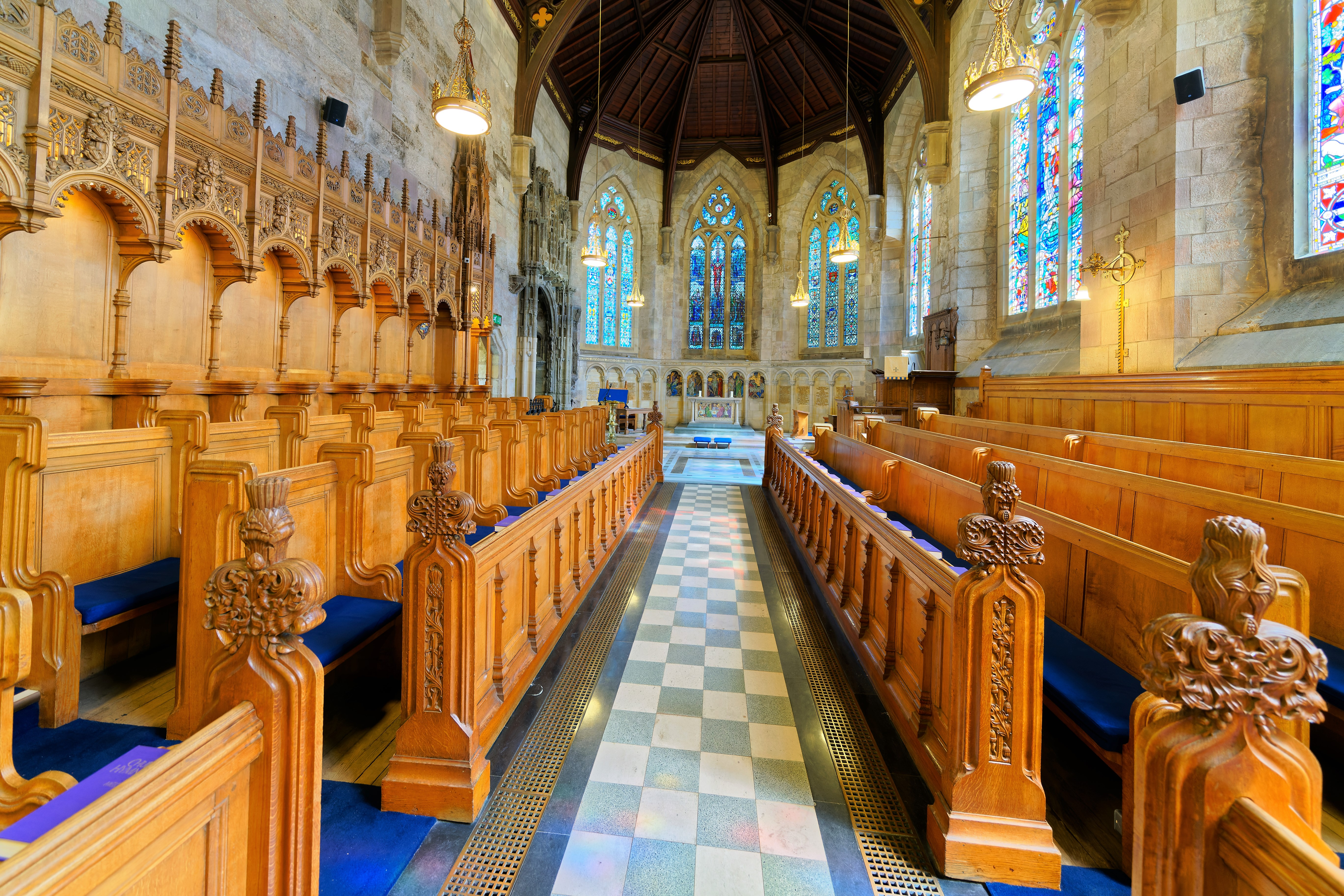
Interior of St Salvator's Chapel

=== Chapels ===
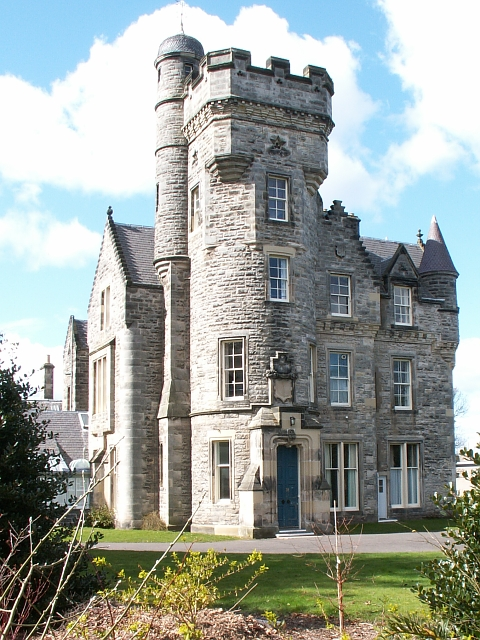
The Wardlaw Wing of University Hall

The university has two collegiate chapels. The chapel of St Salvator's was founded in 1450 by Bishop James Kennedy, and today it is a centre of university life. St Salvator's has a full peal of six bells, and is therefore the only university chapel in Scotland suitable for change ringing. The Chapel of St Leonard's is located in the grounds of the nearby St Leonards School. It is the university's oldest building, with some parts dating from 1144 and is the smaller of the two chapels. St Salvator's and St Leonard's both have their own choirs, whose members are drawn from the student body.

=== Student halls ===
St Andrews is characterised amongst Scottish universities as having a significant number of students who live in university-maintained accommodation. As of 2012, 52% of the student population lives in university halls. The halls vary widely in age and character; the oldest, Deans Court dates from the 12th century, and the newest, Whitehorn Hall, built in 2018. They are built in styles from Gothic revival to brutalist. All are now co-educational and non-smoking, and several are catered. The university guarantees every first-year student a place of accommodation, and many students return to halls in their second, third and final years at St Andrews. From September 2015 onward, students have had the option of living in alcohol-free flats in David Russell Apartments on the grounds of medical conditions that do not allow drinking or for religious reasons.

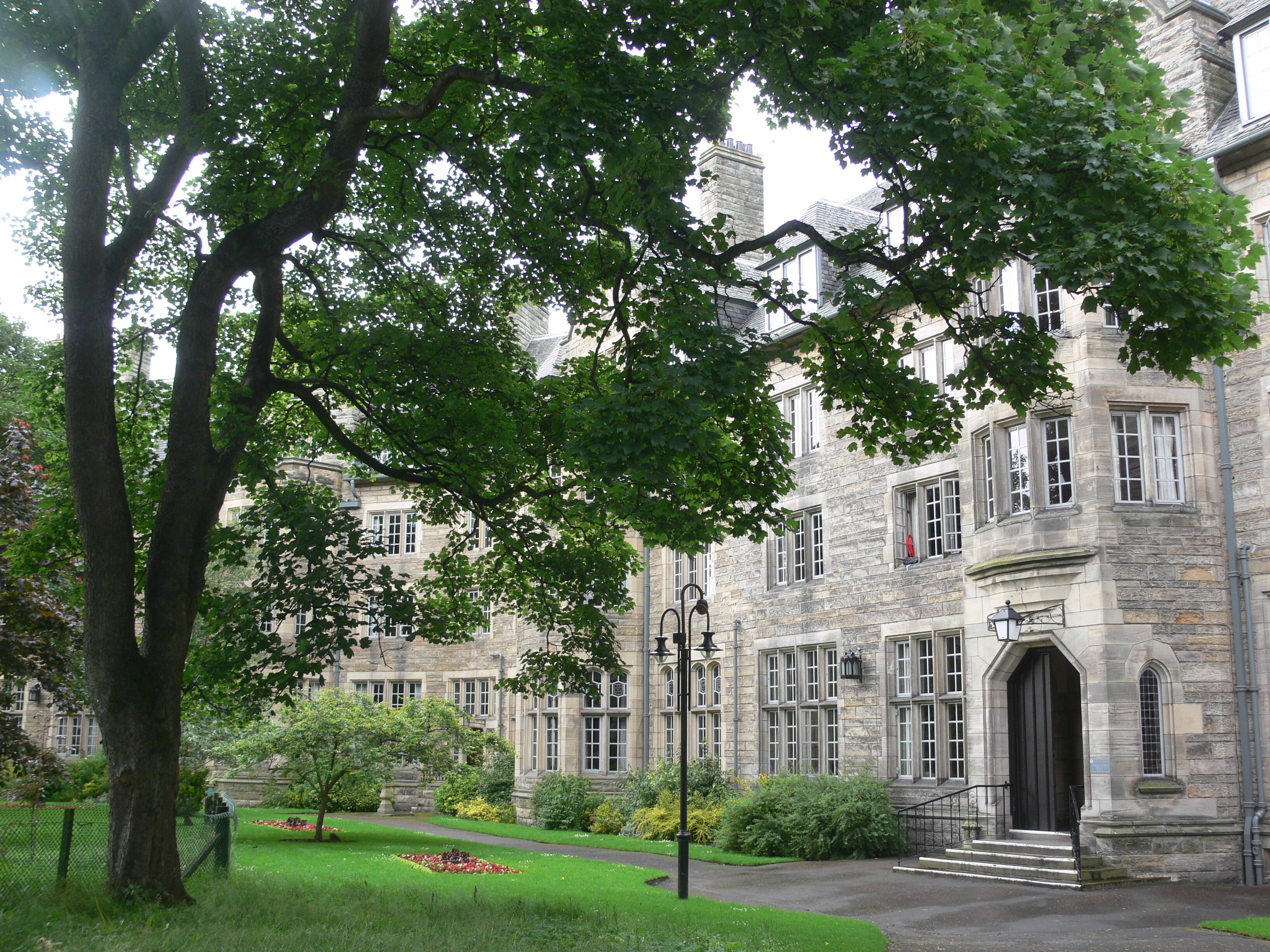
St Salvator's Hall

Halls of residence include:

- Agnes Blackadder Hall
- Albany Park (demolished 2019–2021)
- Andrew Melville Hall
- David Russell Apartments
- Fife Park Apartments
- Gannochy House
- Hamilton Hall (Sold in 2006)
- John Burnet Hall
- McIntosh Hall
- Powell Hall (Postgraduate only)
- St Regulus Hall
- St Salvator's Hall
- University Hall
- Whitehorn Hall (addition to University Hall, 2018)
- Angus and Stanley Smith Houses (Postgraduate only)
- Deans Court (Postgraduate only)
- St Gregory's (Postgraduate only)
- Gregory Place (Postgraduate only)

=== Renewable energy projects ===
Since 2013, the university's endowment has been invested under the United Nations Principles of Responsible Investment (UNPRI) initiative with a sustainable ethical policy enforced since 2007. The university also funds and administers the international St Andrews Prize for the Environment established in 1998, which awards $150,000 annually to three environmental projects around the globe. The university has the target of being the UK's first carbon net zero university by 2035 and has invested in a biomass centre as well as solar and wind farms. It has spent £70 million on the Eden Campus and requires further funding of £100 million to complete works.

The Guardbridge Biomass Energy Centre will generate power using locally sourced wood-fuelled biomass, and hot water will be transported to the university through underground pipes to heat and cool laboratories and student residences. The £25 million project is expected to save 10,000 tonnes of carbon annually and the university aims to establish the site as a knowledge exchange hub which would provide "missing link" facilities to allow research and discoveries made in university labs to be translated to working prototypes. The biomass centre became operational in December 2016 and won the Scottish Green Energy Award in 2023.

In October 2013, the university received permission to build six medium-sized turbines at Kenly Wind Farm, near Boarhills. The wind farms were expected to be operational by 2017 and bring an estimated £22 million boost to the local and national economy saving 19,000 tonnes of carbon annually. However, due to concerns raised by the Ministry of Defence over its proximity to Leuchars Station, as of 2021, the project has been halted.

== Student life ==
=== Students' Association ===
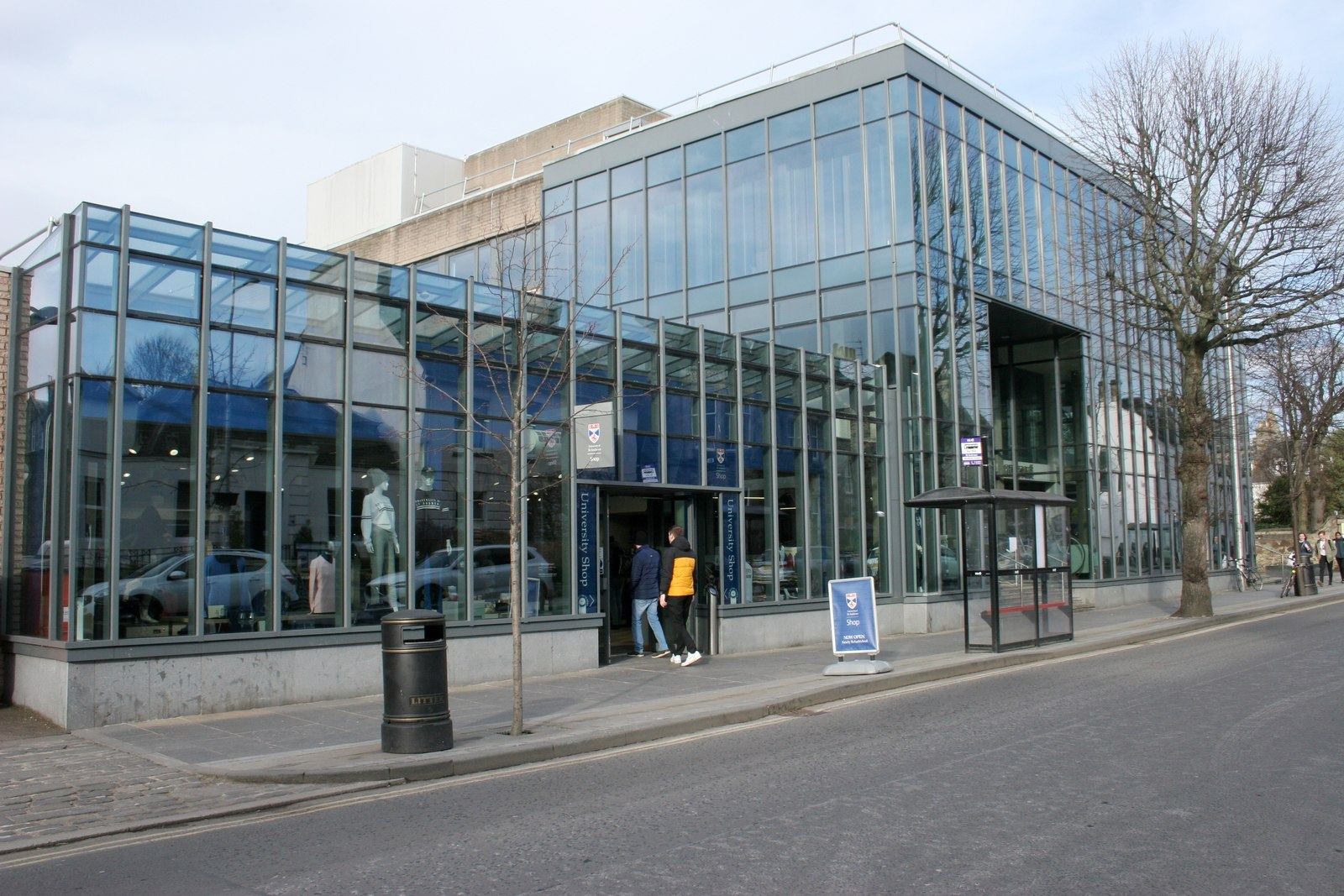
The university shop and Rector's Cafe, part of the Union

The University of St Andrews Students' Association is the organisation that represents the student body of the University of St Andrews. It was founded in 1885 and comprises the students' representative council (SRC) and the Student Activities Forum (SAF) (previously known as the Students' Services Council (SSC)). The Students' Association has 10 SRC subcommittees and 11 SAF subcommittees: SRC: Accommodation, Alumni, BAME Students' Network, Community Relations (ComRels), Disabled Students Network (DSN), Environment, Equal Opportunities (EqualOps), Life Long and Flexible Learners (Lifers), SaintsLGBT+, and Wellbeing. SAF: The Entertainments 'Ents' Committee, Charities Campaign, Union Debating Society, STAR (St Andrews Radio), Mermaids Performing Arts Fund, Design Team, SVS (Student Voluntary Service), the Music Fund (prev. Music is Love), On the Rocks (an annual arts festival), Societies Committee, and the Postgraduate Society. Every matriculated student is automatically a member of each subcommittee.

The Students' Association Building (informally known as the Union) is located on St Mary's Place, St Andrews. Facilities include three bars (Main, Beacon, and Sandy's) and the university's Student Support Services. In 2013 the Students' Association Building underwent a refurbishment. The Students' Association is affiliated to, and a founding member of, the Coalition of Higher Education Students in Scotland but unlike many other students' unions in the UK is not a member of the National Union of Students, having most recently rejected membership in a referendum in November 2012.

=== Societies ===
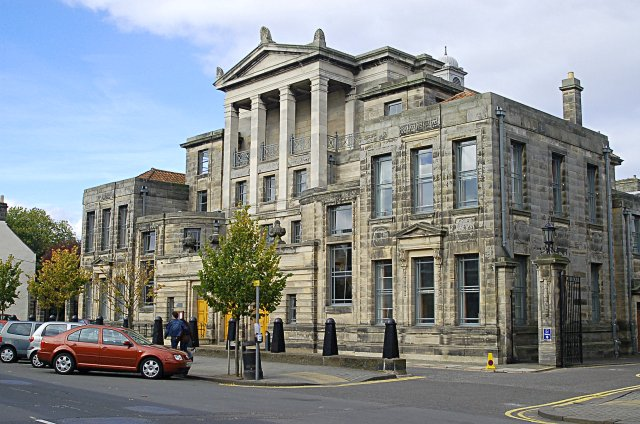
Younger Hall

St Andrews is home to over 200 student societies which cover a wide range of interests.

The oldest student society in St Andrews is the University of St Andrews Celtic Society, which has run continuously without mergers since 1796. It promotes Scottish culture to students of the university and the wider community. Currently, it does this through Scottish Country Dance and Scottish Gaelic Language Classes. Its Scottish Country Dance activities are affiliated with the Royal Scottish Country Dance Society (RSCDS).

All matriculated students are members of the "Union Debating Society", a student debating society that holds weekly public debates in Lower Parliament Hall, often hosts notable speakers, and participates in competitive debating in both national and international competitions. Its origins go back to the 1794 founding of the Literary Society. However its current form only dates back to the 1890 merger with the Classical Society. Since its roots can be traced back to 1794, it claims to be the oldest continuously run student debating society in the world.

There is a strong tradition of student media at St Andrews. The university's two newspapers are The Saint, a fortnightly publication, and The Stand, an online publication founded in 2011. There is also the Foreign Affairs Review ran by the Foreign Affairs Society and the first legal publication in town – the St Andrews Law Review - was launched in 2020. There are also a number of smaller student publications including The Wynd, a student-run magazine, ST.ART, a student-run arts magazine founded in 2011 and The Regulus, a student magazine focusing on politics and current affairs. In addition to this there are several student-led academic journals, most notably, Stereoscope Magazine which is focused on student photography and raising awareness of the university's historic photographic collection, Ha@sta, an annual journal for those interested in art history, Aporia, the journal of the Philosophy Society, and the Postgraduate Journal of Art History and Museum Studies. The university's radio station is STAR: St Andrews Radio, an online station that broadcasts 24/7 during term time. Scoot Around is a literary-cultural magazine based in St Andrews with contributors from universities around the world.The Sinner is an independent website and discussion forum set up by students of the university.

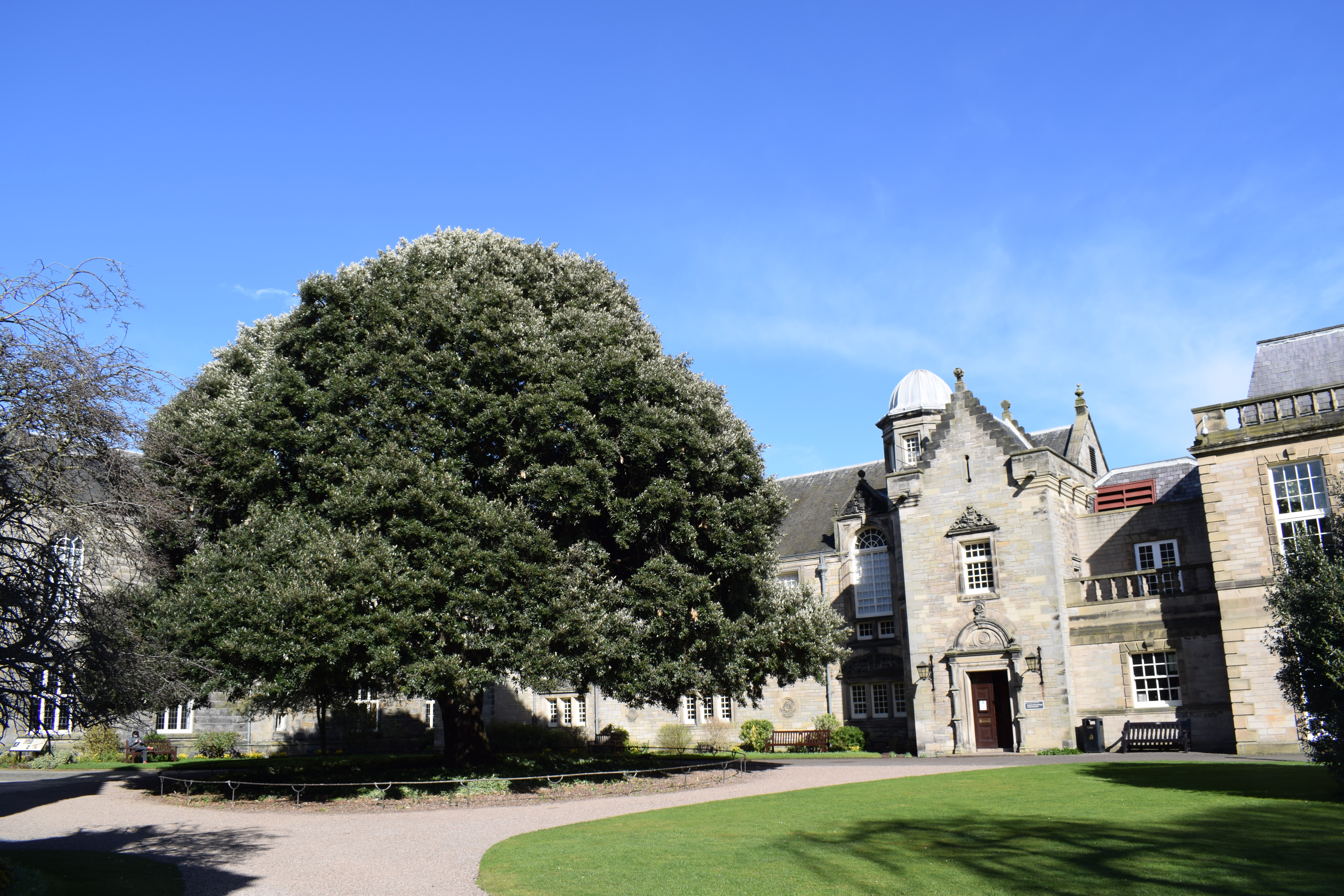
Quadrangle of St Mary's College

The university's Music Society comprises many student-run musical groups, including the university's flagship symphony orchestra, wind band, and chorus. One of the oldest choirs in the university is the St Andrews University Madrigal Group, which performs a concert each term and has an annual summer tour. The A Cappella Society represents all four a cappella groups at St Andrews: The Other Guys, The Alleycats, The Accidentals and The Hummingbirds. From 2009 to 2011, all four of these groups participated in The Voice Festival UK(VF-UK) competition, and The Other Guys, The Accidentals, and The Alleycats all reached the London final.

Student theatre at the University of St Andrews is funded by the Mermaids Performing Arts fund. There are regular dramatic and comedic performances staged at the Barron at the Byre Theatre and the Union StAge. Blind Mirth is the university's improvisational theatre troupe, which performs weekly in the town, and annually takes a production to the Edinburgh Fringe Festival.

The Kate Kennedy Club plays a significant role in the life of the university, maintaining university traditions such as the Kate Kennedy Procession, in which students parade through the town dressed as eminent figures from the university's history, and organising social events such as the Opening and May balls. Founded in 1926, the club is composed of around thirty matriculated students, who are selected by the club's members. The club has received criticism from the university's former principal, Louise Richardson, and alumna the Duchess of Rothesay, over its previously male-only admission policy. In 2012, the club decided to allow female students to join.

St Andrews is home to several other private clubs, such as The Kensington Club, founded in 1739 by Alexander Laird Balgonie and is an all-male dining club that organises private events for members. The St Andrews Fight Club hosts an annual boxing match, training 20 amateur boxers in an intensive course.

=== Sports clubs and the Athletic Union ===
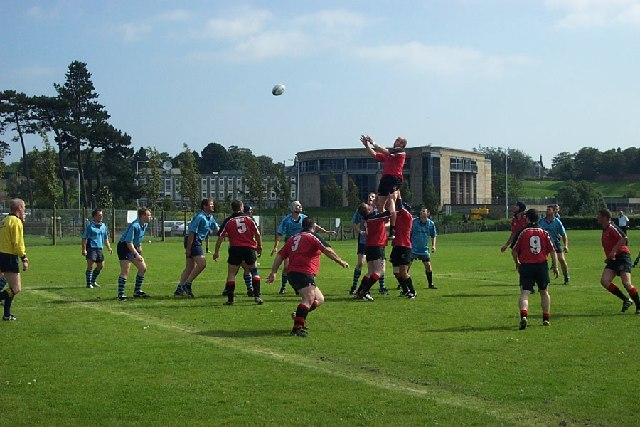
Madras RFC Playing Fields St Andrews

The University of St Andrews Athletic Union is the student representative body for sport. Established in 1901, it is affiliated to BUCS and encompasses around sixty sports clubs, who compete at both a recreational and high-performance level. A notable club is the University of St Andrews Rugby Football Club, which played a pivotal role in shaping the sport and has produced Scottish international players such as J. S. Thomson and Alfred Clunies-Ross.

In 2015, the university underwent a £14 million five-phase development of the student sports centre which included a new 400-seat eight-court sports hall, a new reception area and expanded gym facilities.

The Scottish Varsity, also known as the 'world's oldest varsity match', is played annually against the University of Edinburgh.

== Traditions ==
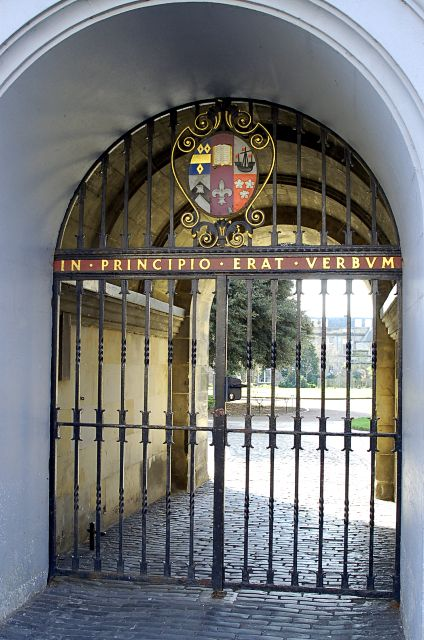
Entrance to St Mary's College

=== Sponsio Academica ===
In order to become a student at the university a person must take an oath in Latin at the point of matriculation, called the Sponsio Academica, although this tradition now has been digitised and is agreed to as part of an online matriculation process.

Nos ingenui adolescentes, nomina subscribentes, sancte pollicemur nos preceptoribus obsequium debitum exhibituros in omnibus rebus ad disciplinam et bonos mores pertinentibus, Senatus Academici autoritati obtemperaturos, et hujus Academiae Andreanae emolumentum et commodum, quantum in nobis sit, procuraturos, ad quemcunque vitae statum pervenerimus. Item agnoscimus si quis nostrum indecore turbulenterve se gesserit vel si parum diligentem in studiis suis se praebuerit neque admonitus se in melius correxerit eum licere Senatui Academico vel poena congruenti adficere vel etiam ex Universitate expellere.

In English:

We students who set down our names hereunder in all good faith make a solemn promise that we shall show due deference to our teachers in all matters relating to order and good conduct, that we shall be subject to the authority of the Senatus Academicus and shall, whatever be the position we attain hereafter, promote, so far as lies in our power, the profit and the interest in our University of St Andrews. Further, we recognise that, if any of us conducts ourselves in an unbecoming or disorderly manner or shows insufficient diligence in their studies and, though admonished, does not improve, it is within the power of the Senatus Academicus to inflict on such students a fitting penalty or even expel them from the University.

=== University blessing and grace ===
Peter Redford Scott Lang reintroduced a tradition of praying the grace before and after meals when he brought back student common dinners in 1887. According to Lang, the use of Latin graces at student meals had disappeared by the time of Samuel Johnson's visit to St Andrews in 1773. Johnson was astonished that the grace was not recited in Latin, and it was requested that he write a Latin grace for the university. Common meals at the university ceased in 1820 and so did the grace with them. Lang wrote that he learned of the grace from George Edward Day, who himself learned it from an elder retired professor while visiting Sir Benjamin Ward Richardson. At dinner, the retired professor recited a short grace, explaining that Johnson's grace was so long that the president could not remember it except for one sentence: Sit nomen domini benedictum (blessed be the name of the Lord). The shorter grace became the standard until common dinners ceased to occur. Reinstituting common student dinners in 1887, Lang reintroduced the university blessing and university grace.

Due to the story of the composition of the graces by Samuel Johnson, there has previously been a belief that the University of St Andrews' graces derived from Johnson's alma mater, Pembroke College, Oxford. According to a historian of the University of St Andrews, Ronald Gordon Cant, the current graces and the music settings composed for them "although based on traditional forms, these forms had no specific connection with earlier St Andrews usage, and bear no resemblance whatsoever to the old Pembroke grace". Thus, Cant states that the current graces "were specially composed for the Common Dinners instituted in 1887".

University Blessing:

Sit nomen Domini Benedictum per Jesum Christum salvatorem nostrum. Amen. (Blessed be the name of the Lord through Jesus Christ, our Saviour. Amen.)

University Grace: Before Meat:

Gloria Patri Filio Spirituique Sancto In Saecula Saeculorum. Amen. (Glory be to the Father, the Son, and the Holy Spirit. World Without End. Amen.)

After Meat:

Deo Gratias. (Thanks be to God.)

=== Gowns ===
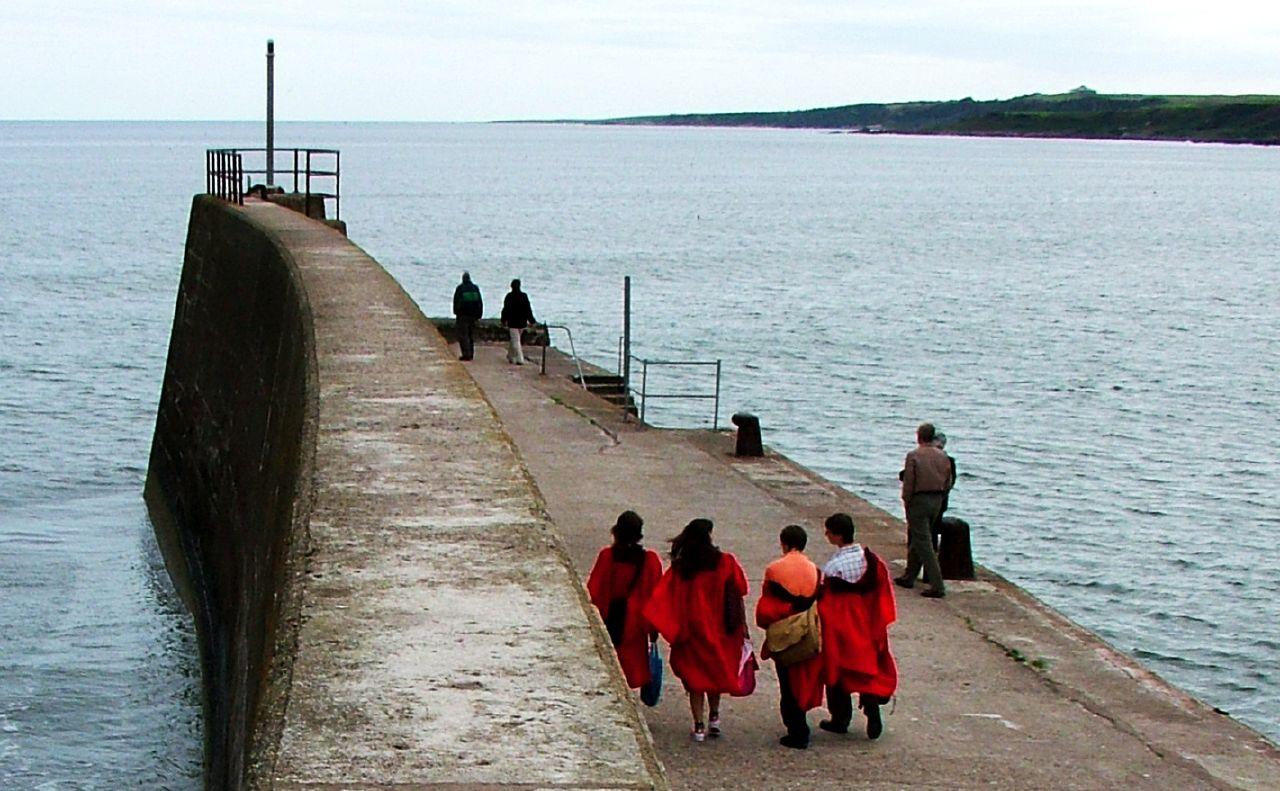
St Andrews students in undergraduate gowns

One of the most conspicuous traditions at St Andrews is the wearing of academic dress, particularly the distinctive red undergraduate gown of the United College. Undergraduates in Arts and Science subjects can be seen wearing these garments at the installation of a rector or chancellor, at chapel services, on 'Pier Walks', at formal hall dinners, at meetings of the Union Debating Society, and giving tours to prospective students and visitors as well as on St Andrews Day. Divinity students wear a black undergraduate gown with a purple saltire cross on the left facing. Postgraduates wear the graduate gown or, as members of St Leonard College, may wear a black gown trimmed with burgundy, introduced for graduate students whose original university is without academic dress. (See Academic dress of the University of St Andrews.) St Mary's College Post Graduates, however, wear their graduate gown with a purple saltire cross on the left facing.

=== Bejant ===
Bejant (Bejan) is a French term (bec jaune) meaning yellow beak or nestling, borrowed from the university of Paris and used to refer to first-year male students; females being described as Bejantines. Second-year students are known as a Semis, a student in their third year may be referred to as a Tertian, and in their final year as a Magistrand. These terms are thought to be unique to St Andrews. When wearing their traditional red gowns, students in each year may be identified according to the way they wear their gowns. In the first year, the gown is worn on the shoulders, in the second year it is worn slightly off the shoulders. In the third year, arts students wear their gowns off their left shoulders, and science students off their right shoulders. Finally, fourth-years wear their gowns right down to their elbows, ready to shed their scarlet gowns for the black graduation gown. The gown is never to be joined at the top as this is considered bad luck.

=== Academic parents ===
The students of the university enjoy an unusual family tradition designed to make new students feel at home and build relationships within the student body. Traditionally, a Bejant or Bejantine acquires academic parents who are at least in their third year as students, who informally guide and mentor them in academic and social matters in their time at the university. it is not rare for such academic family ties to stretch well beyond student days. Tradition has it that a Bejant may ask a man to be his Senior Man but must be invited by a woman who is prepared to be his Senior Woman. Similarly, a Bejantine may ask a male to be her Senior Man but there is no overt rule regarding how she acquires a Senior Woman. The establishment of these relationships begins at the very start of the first semester – with the aim of being in place ahead of Raisin Weekend.

=== Raisin Weekend ===
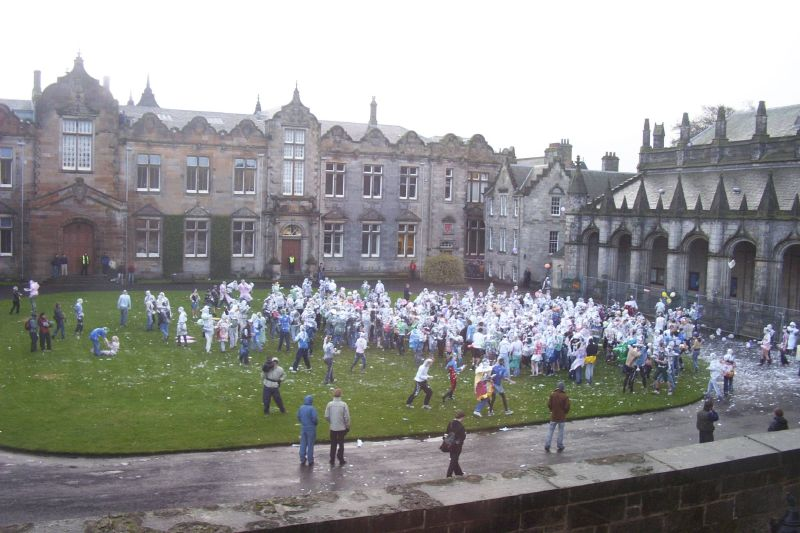
St Salvator's Quadrangle during the Raisin Weekend foam fight

Raisin Weekend celebrates the relationship between the Bejants/ Bejantines (first-year students) and their respective academic parents. It is traditionally said that students went up to study with a sack of oatmeal and a barrel of salt-herring as staple foods to last them a term and that, therefore, anything more exotic was seen as a luxury. In return for the guidance from academic parents, a further tradition sprang up of rewarding these "parents" with a pound of raisins. Since the 19th century, the giving of raisins was steadily transformed into the giving of a more modern alternative, such as a bottle of wine (although presents are now rarely expected). In return for the raisins or equivalent present, the parents give their "children" a formal receipt – the Raisin Receipt – composed in Latin. Over time this receipt progressively became more elaborate and often humorous. The receipt can be written on anything and is to be carried everywhere by the Bejant/Bejantine on the morning of Raisin Monday until midday.

Raisin Weekend is held annually over the last weekend of October. Affairs often begin with a tea party (or similar) thrown by the mother(s) and then a pub crawl or house party led by the father(s). It is fairly common for several academic families to combine in the latter stages of the revels. At midday all the First-Years gather in Quad of St Salvator's College to compare their receipts and also to be open to challenge from older students who may look for errors in the Latin of the receipt (an almost inevitable occurrence). Upon detection of such error(s) the bearer may be required to sing the Gaudie. In more recent years the gathering has culminated in a shaving foam fight. Since 2014, the foam fight has been moved from St Salvator's Quad to the adjacent Lower College Lawn. Raisin Weekend has also become synonymous with binge drinking and a certain amount of humiliation of "academic children", commonly involving embarrassing costumes or drinking games. The University Students' Association provides a special First Aid hotline for Raisin Weekend.

=== Curse of Patrick Hamilton ===
Situated around the town of St Andrews are cobblestone markings denoting where Protestant martyrs were burnt at the stake. To students, the most notable of these is the cobblestone initials "PH" located outside the main gate of St Salvator's College. These cobblestones denote where Patrick Hamilton was martyred in 1528. According to student tradition, stepping on the "PH" will cause a student to become cursed, with the effect that the offender will fail his or her degree and so students are known to jump over the cobblestones when passing. The 'curse' is said to be lifted by participating in the May Dip.

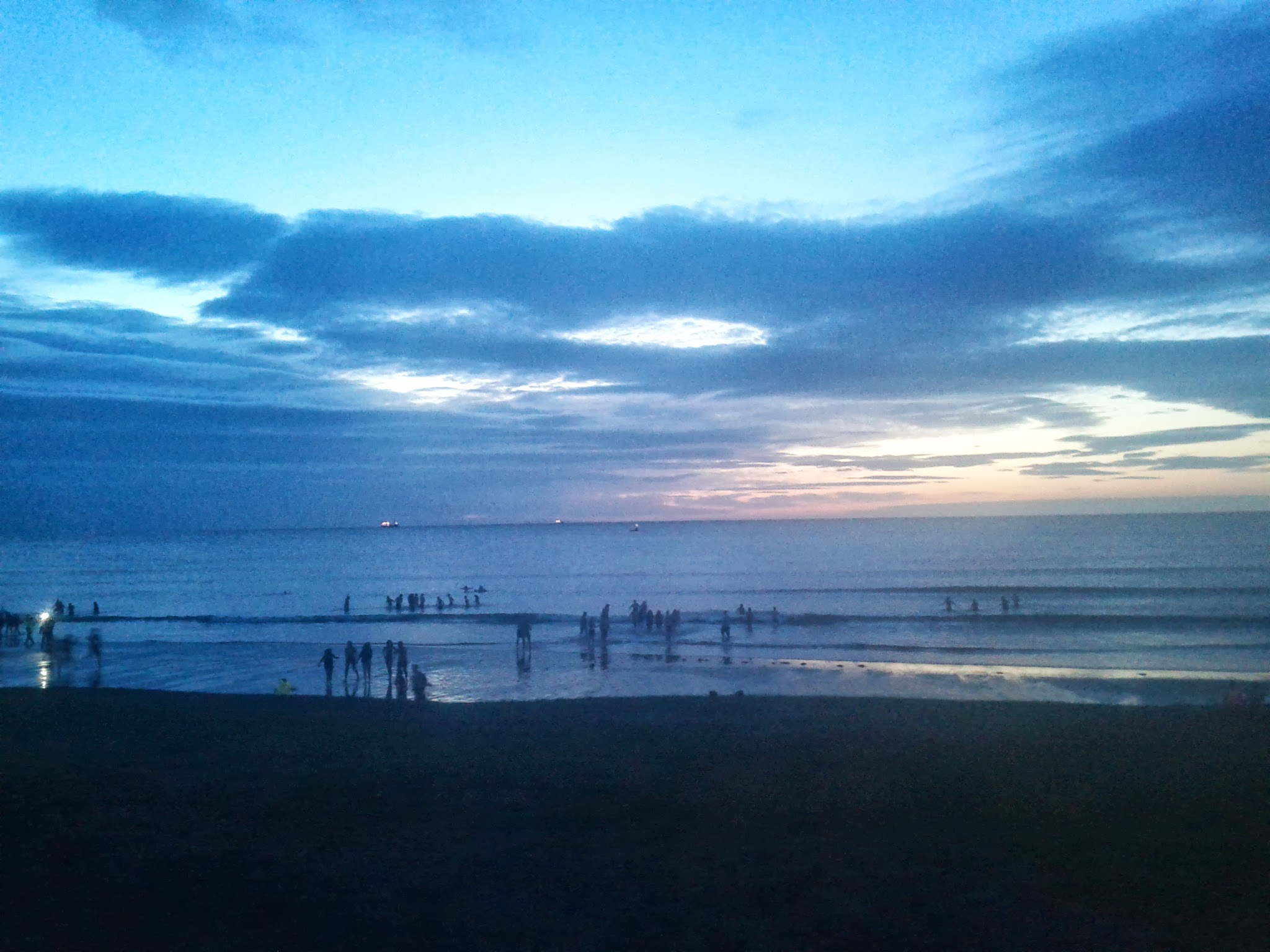
St Andrews May Dip 2013

=== May Dip ===
The May Dip is a student tradition held annually at dawn on May Day. Students usually stay awake until dawn, at which time they collectively run into the North Sea to the sound of madrigals sung by the University Madrigal Group. Students purportedly do so to cleanse themselves of any academic sins (which they may have acquired by stepping on the PH cobblestone) before they sit exams in May. In 2011, the event was "officially" moved by the Students' Association to East Sands in response to concerns for health and safety in its former location on Castle Sands.

== Publications ==
The Centre for the Study of Terrorism and Political Violence (CSTPV), within the School of International Relations, publishes the online open-access journal Contemporary Voices: St Andrews Journal of International Relations (formerly Journal of Terrorism Research).

== Notable people ==
=== Alumni ===
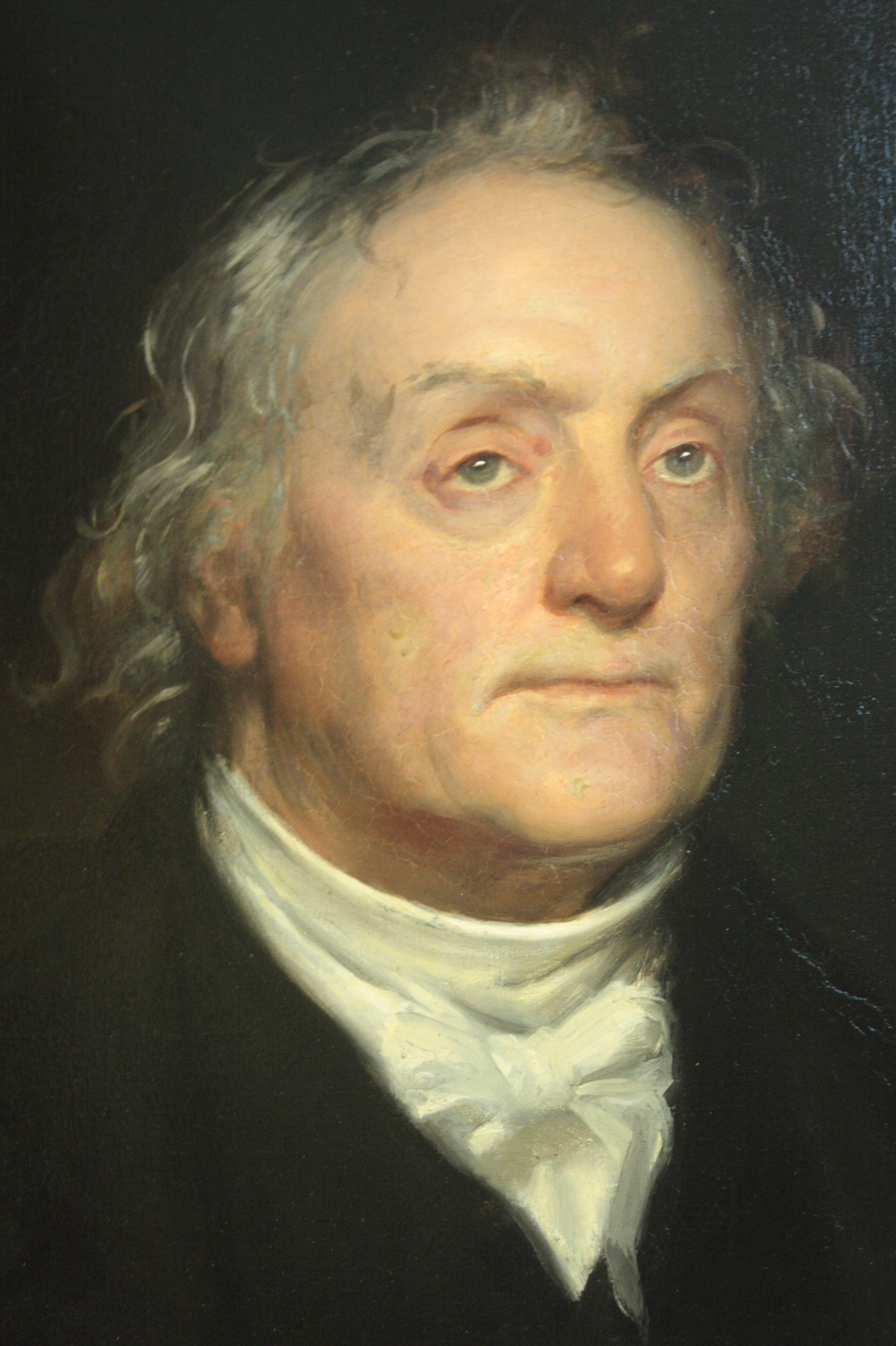
Thomas Chalmers

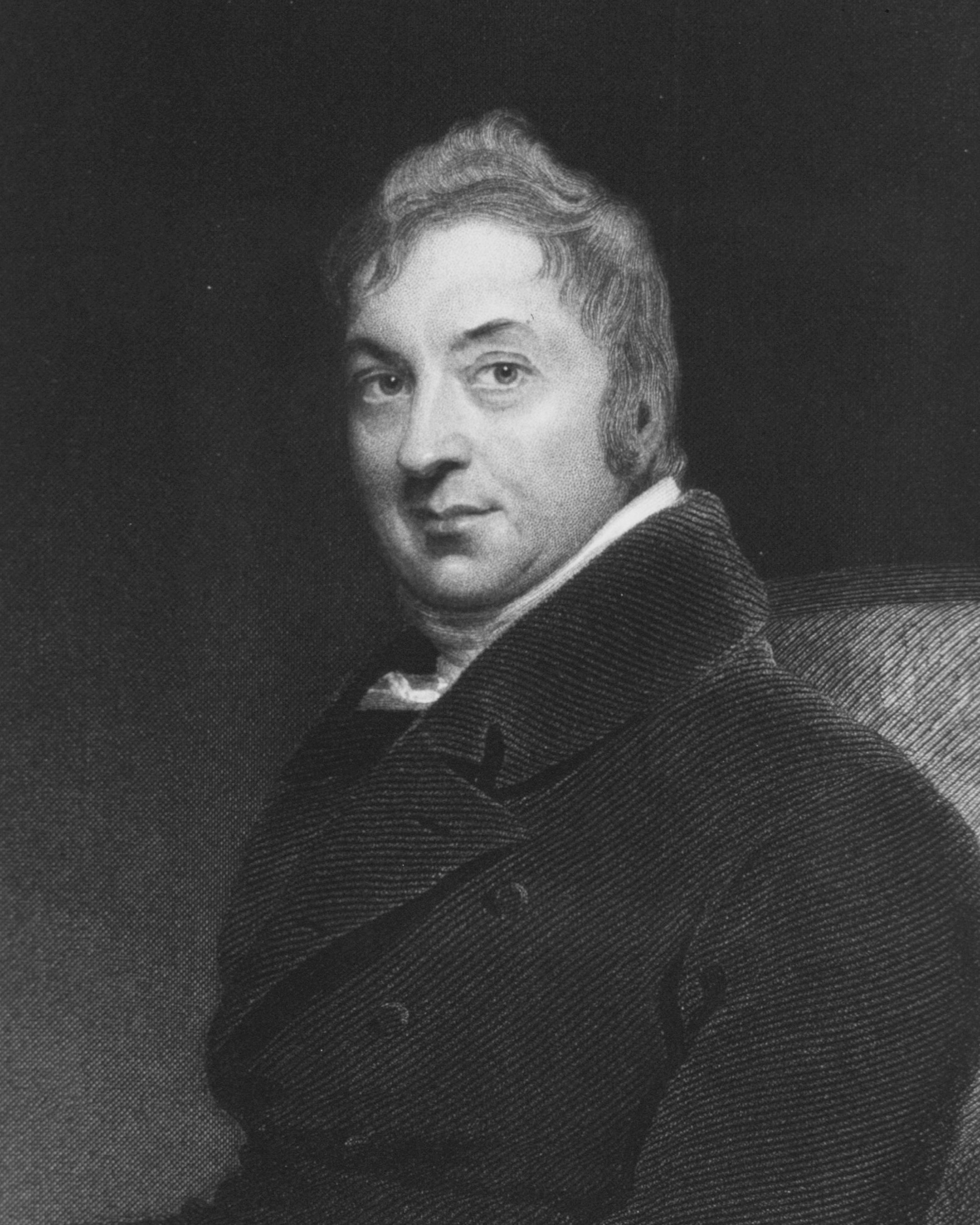
Edward Jenner

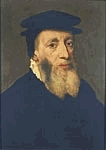
John Knox

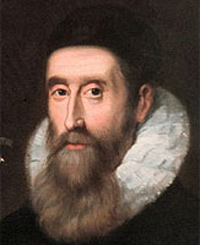
John Napier

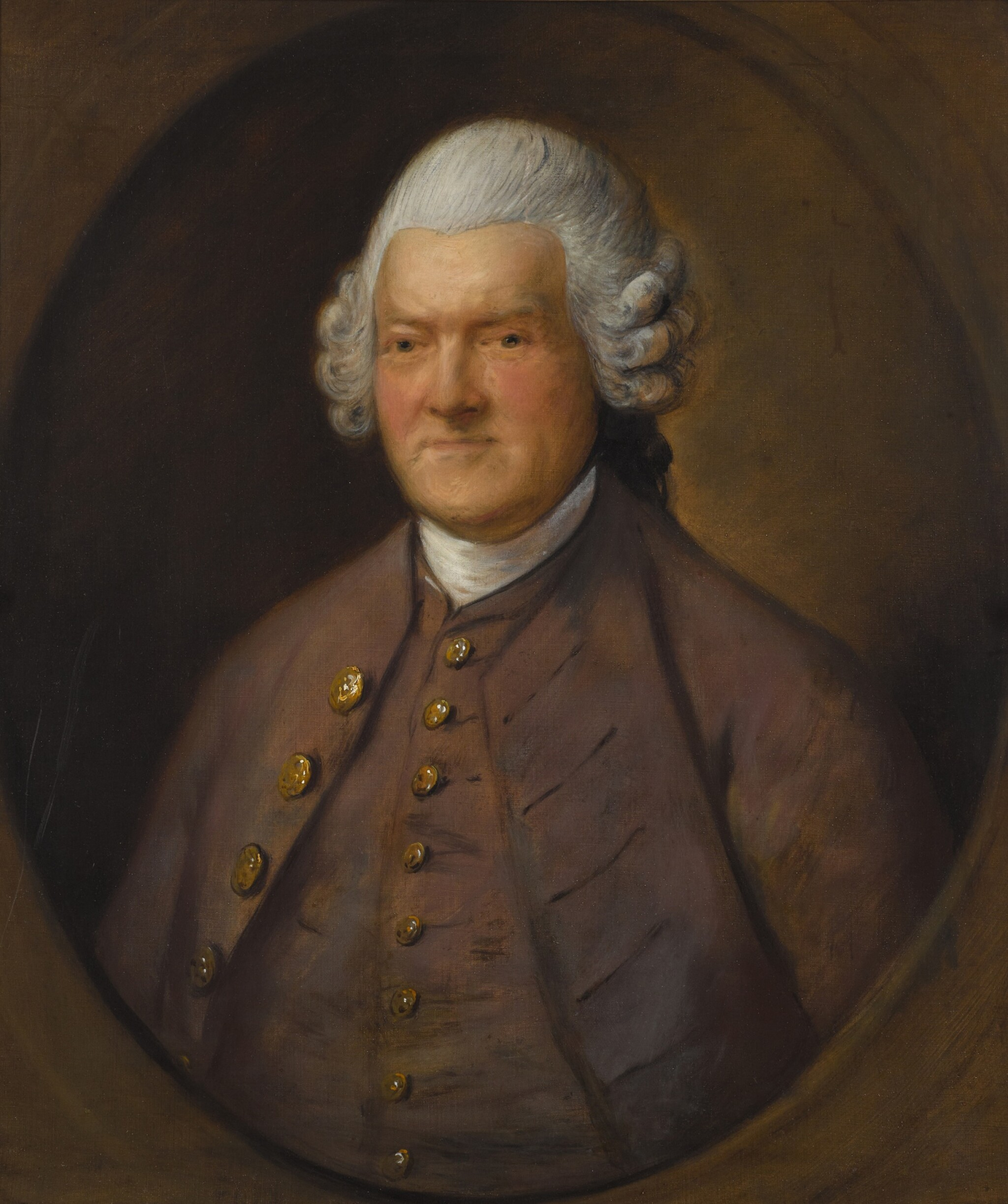
John Pringle

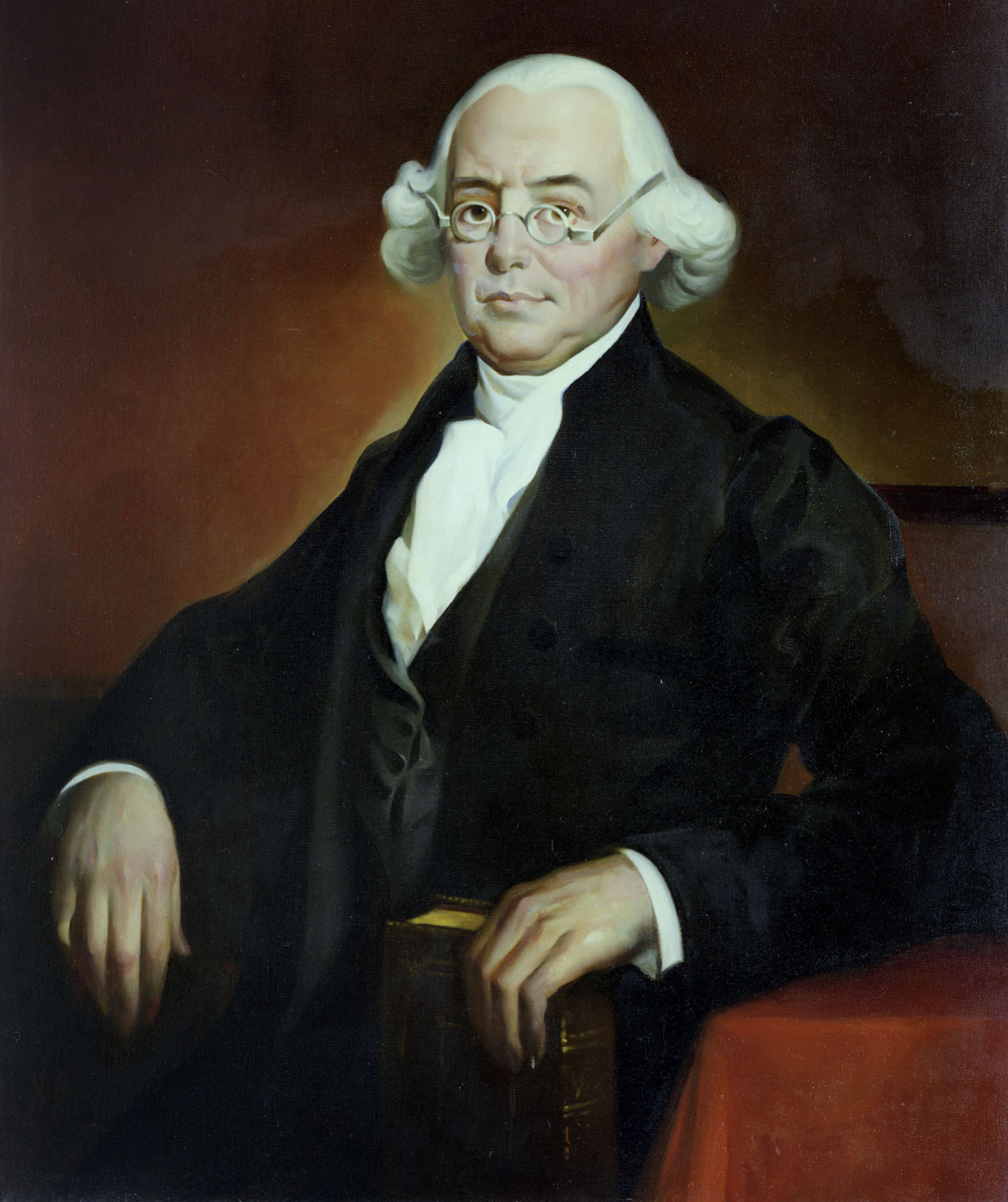
James Wilson

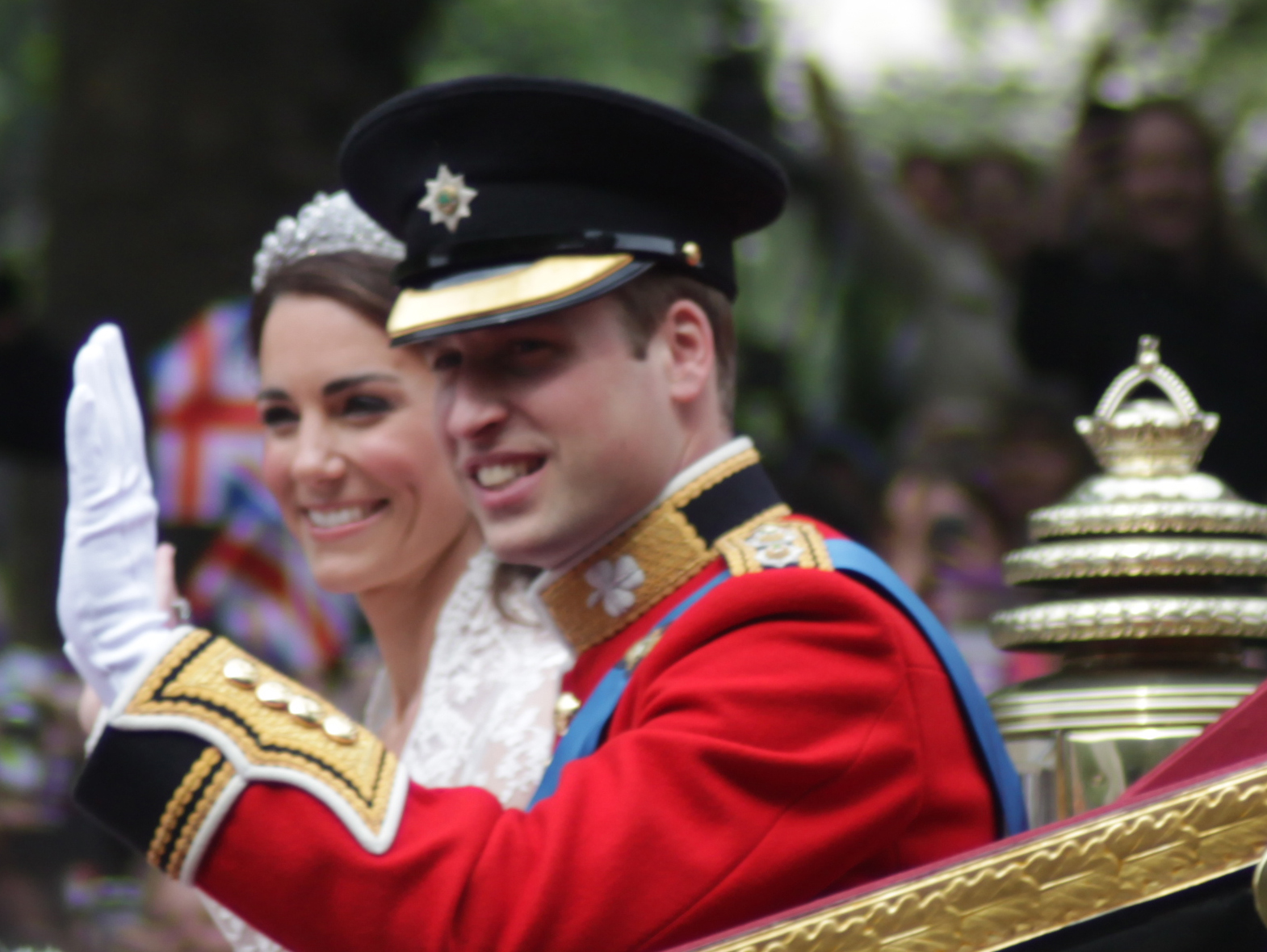
William, Prince of Wales and Catherine, Princess of Wales graduated together in 2005 with degrees in Geography and History of Art respectively.

Notable University of St Andrews alumni include King James II of Scotland; United States Declaration of Independence signatory James Wilson (1761); Governor General of Canada John Campbell; discoverer of logarithms John Napier (1563); founder of the Church of Scotland and leader of the Protestant Reformation John Knox (1531); notable Leader of the Church of Scotland Thomas Chalmers; founder of and the first chancellor of the University of Glasgow William Turnbull; founder of the University of Edinburgh Robert Reid; founder of the world's first commercial savings bank Henry Duncan (1823); journalist and politician during the French Revolution Jean-Paul Marat (1775 MD); inventor of beta-blockers, H2 receptor antagonists and Nobel Prize in Medicine winner James W. Black (1946 MB ChB); the 'father of military medicine' Sir John Pringle, 1st Baronet; pioneer of the smallpox vaccine Edward Jenner (1792 MD); the 'father of medical services in Pakistan' Wajid Ali Khan Burki (1924 MB ChB); William, Prince of Wales (2005); Catherine, Princess of Wales (2005) and Lady Louise Mountbatten-Windsor (2026).

Alumni in the fields of academia and education have gone on to found the University of Melbourne Medical School (Anthony Brownless) and the Scottish Church College in Calcutta (Alexander Duff was also the first Scottish missionary to India), become the first Regent and first principal of the University of Edinburgh (Robert Rollock), dean of Harvard Divinity School (David Hempton), the Vice Chancellors of Aberdeen University (Ian Diamond), University of Nottingham (Shearer West), Open University (Walter Perry was also the first vice-chancellor) and Sydney University (Gavin Brown), chancellor of the University of Maine System (James H. Page), provost of Eton College (Eric Anderson), discoverer of the Berry Phase (Sir Michael Berry) and inventor of the Leslie cube John Leslie.

In business and finance, St Andrews graduates have become the CEOs of multinational companies including BHP (Andrew Mackenzie), BP (Robert Horton), FanDuel (Nigel Eccles co-founded the company with fellow St Andrews graduate, Lesley Eccles), Rolls-Royce Holdings (John Rose), Royal Dutch Shell (Robert Paul Reid), Tate & Lyle (Iain Ferguson) and Royal Bank of Scotland (George Mathewson). Other notable businesspeople include Banker Olivier Sarkozy, director of the Edinburgh Festival Fringe Alistair Moffat and the CEO of Scottish Rugby Union and ATP World Tour Finals Phil Anderton.

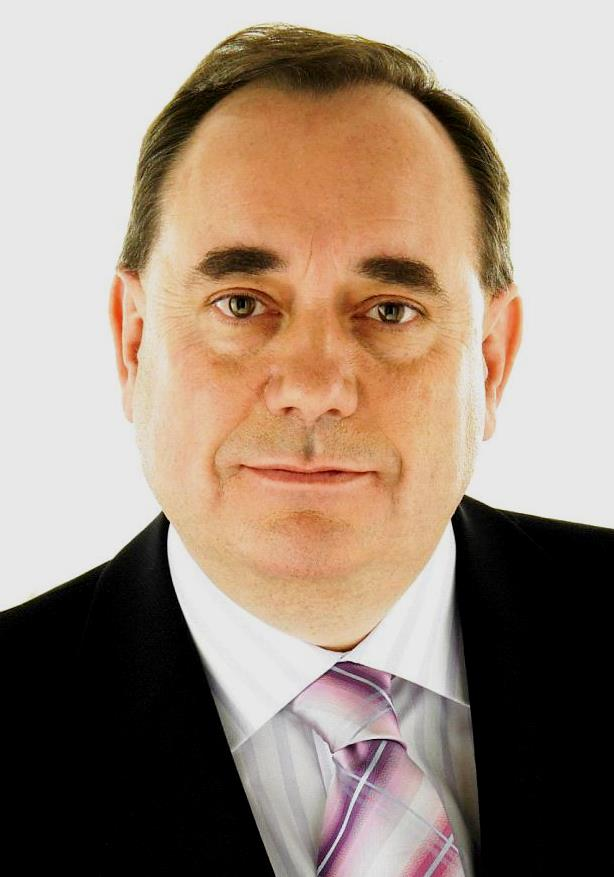
Alex Salmond was the First Minister of Scotland and Leader of the SNP during the Scottish Independence Referendum in 2014.

Former St Andrews students active in politics and national intelligence include two Chiefs of MI6 Alex Younger and John Sawers, two deputy directors of the Secret Intelligence Service (MI6), George Kennedy Young and J. M. Bruce Lockhart, Secretary of State for Scotland Lord Forsyth (Forsyth is also former deputy chairman of JP Morgan), former First Minister of Scotland and leader of the SNP for over 20 years Alex Salmond, former Cabinet Secretary and head of the Civil Service Sir Mark Sedwill, former Secretary of State for Defence Sir Michael Fallon, Deputy Leader of the Liberal Democrats Malcolm Bruce and leader of the Christian Party James George Hargreaves. Outside of the UK, alumni include the financial secretary of Hong Kong credited with laying the foundations for Hong Kong's economic success John James Cowperthwaite, former senior director for European and Russian affairs on the United States National Security Council, Fiona Hill, David Holmes (both were involved in the Impeachment inquiry against Donald Trump), and the first female cabinet minister in Egypt, Hikmat Abu Zayd. Alumni have also gone on to serve as diplomats including the current Permanent Representative of the United Kingdom to the United Nations and former British Ambassador to China (2015–2020) Dame Barbara Woodward, former ambassador to Russia (2008–2011) Dame Anne Pringle and Thomas Bruce who is known for the removal of the Elgin Marbles from the Parthenon.

Alumni from the media and the arts include founder of Forbes magazine B. C. Forbes, founder of The Week Jolyon Connell, former Director of Communications at Downing Street and former controller of BBC World News Craig Oliver, political editor of BBC Scotland Brian Taylor, BBC News presenter Louise Minchin, BBC Sport TV presenter Hazel Irvine, editor of Tatler Richard Dennen, Primetime Emmy Award winning screenwriter David Butler, Pulitzer Prize winning author James Michener, feminist writer Fay Weldon, poet Len Pennie, musician The Pictish Trail and actors Siobhan Redmond, Crispin Bonham-Carter, Ian McDiarmid, David Caves and Jonathan Taylor Thomas.

Other notable alumni include 'father of the poll tax' Douglas Mason, founders of the Adam Smith Institute, Madsen Pirie and Eamonn Butler, former Solicitor General of the United States Elizabeth Prelogar, former Lord Justice General Lord Cullen, two former members of the Inner House, Lord Eassie and Baroness Clark of Calton, one of the leading figures in the formation of the United States Golf Association Charles B. Macdonald, the captain of Tottenham Hotspur F.C. during its double-winning season Danny Blanchflower, and the wildlife conservationist Saba Douglas-Hamilton.

The university also boasts a roll of honorary graduates whose members include Benjamin Franklin, Hillary Clinton, Bob Dylan, Arvo Pärt, Maggie Smith, Sean Connery, Nora K. Chadwick, Martha Nussbaum, Joseph Stevenson, Lisa Jardine, Seamus Heaney, Bahram Beyzai, Georg Cantor, and David Attenborough.

=== Academics ===
Notable University of St Andrews faculty include Nobel Prize in Medicine winner Maurice Wilkins (lecturer in physics 1945–1946) and discoverer of herring bodies Percy Theodore Herring (Chandos Chair of Medicine and Anatomy 1908–1948). The Morris water navigation task was developed by Richard Morris at the university's Gatty Marine Laboratory.

Anthropology

- Paloma Gay y Blasco
- Peter Gow
- Ladislav Holý
- Joanna Overing

Biology

- Struther Arnott
- Maria Dornelas
- Patrick Geddes
- Tracey Gloster
- Adrian Horridge
- Susan D. Healy
- D'Arcy Wentworth Thompson

Business and Management

- Meaghan Delahunt
- Robert Gray

Chemistry

- Peter Bruce
- Rebecca Goss
- Norman Haworth
- James Irvine
- Russell E Morris
- James H Naismith
- Catherine Steele
- Michael Bühl

Classics

- Walter Burkert
- Lewis Campbell
- Chris Carey
- John Craig
- Kenneth Dover
- James Donaldson
- Stephen Halliwell
- Jill Harries
- Wallace Lindsay
- William Lorimer
- Rebecca Sweetman

Computer Science

- Jack Cole
- Ian Gent

Divinity

- John Adamson
- Mario Aguilar
- Robert Arnot
- Donald Macpherson Baillie
- Robert Baron
- Richard Bauckham
- Matthew Black
- Ian Bradley
- David Brown
- Thomas Chalmers
- Nicol Dalgleish
- Ivor Davidson
- George Duncan
- Philip Esler
- Timothy Gorringe
- James Haldenston
- Robert Halliday
- Daphne Hampson
- Alexander Henderson
- George Hill
- Andrew Melville
- Nicholas Thomas Wright

Economics

- Ralph Harris, Baron Harris of High Cross
- David A. Jaeger
- Clara Ponsatí i Obiols

Engineering

- Angus Robertson Fulton

English, Literature, and Poetry

- Michael J. Alexander
- Meg Bateman
- John Burnside
- Robert Crawford
- Douglas Dunn
- Roger Lancelyn Green
- Robert Irwin
- Kathleen Jamie
- John Johnston
- A. L. Kennedy
- William Angus Knight
- Don Paterson

Languages and Linguistics

- Peter Branscombe
- George Hadow

Geology

- Christopher Hawkesworth

History and Art History

- Geoffrey Adams
- Frances Andrews
- Ali M. Ansari
- G.W.S. Barrow
- Robert Bartlett
- Alison Beach
- Michael Bentley
- Paul Bibire
- Michael Brown
- George Buchanan
- Nora K. Chadwick
- Barrie Dobson
- Aileen Fyfe
- Norman Gash
- Chris Given-Wilson
- John Guy
- Robert Kerr Hannay
- John Hudson
- Caroline Humfress
- Tomasz Kamusella
- Martin Kemp
- John Philipps Kenyon
- Colin Kidd
- Paul Magdalino
- Elena Marushiakova
- Phillips O'Brien
- Andrew Pettegree
- Guy Rowlands
- Hamish Scott
- Christopher Smout
- Richard Whatmore
- Alex Woolf

International Relations and Politics

- Bruce Hoffman
- John Lindsay of Balcarres, Lord Menmuir
- Hew Strachan
- David Veness
- Paul Wilkinson

Mathematics and Astronomy

- John Couch Adams
- Rosemary A. Bailey
- Stephen Buckland
- Peter Cameron
- George Chrystal
- Edward Copson
- Kenneth Falconer
- James Gregory
- Alan Hood
- John Mackintosh Howie
- Douglas Samuel Jones
- John O'Connor
- Eric Priest
- Edmund F. Robertson
- Colva Roney-Dougal
- Herbert Turnbull

Media and Film Studies

- Dina Iordanova

Medicine and Physiology

- John Adamson
- Oswald Taylor Brown
- George Edward Day
- Margaret Fairlie
- John Forfar
- Percy Theodore Herring
- Robert Hunter
- Joseph Fairweather Lamb

Philosophy and Logic

- Thomas Spencer Baynes
- Piers Benn
- Bernard Bosanquet
- C. D. Broad
- Sarah Broadie
- John Burnet
- Archibald Campbell
- Herman Cappelen
- Gershom Carmichael
- Laurence Jonathan Cohen
- James Main Dixon
- James Drever
- James Frederick Ferrier
- Adam Ferguson
- John Joseph Haldane
- Bob Hale
- Geoffrey Hunter
- Malcolm Knox
- John Major
- Graham Priest
- David George Ritchie
- John Skorupski
- George Stout
- A.D. Woozley
- Crispin Wright

Physics and Astronomy

- H. Stanley Allen
- John F. Allen
- Adam Anderson
- Sir Michael Berry
- David Brewster
- Charles Coulson
- James David Forbes
- Dirk ter Haar
- Emilios T. Harlaftis
- Alan Hood
- Thomas F Krauss
- Johannes Kuenen
- Andrew P. Mackenzie FRS

Psychology

- William Fitch
- Kay Redfield Jamison
- Malcolm Jeeves

Zoology

- Ian L. Boyd
- H. G. Callan
- William Thomas Calman

== In literature and popular culture ==
The University of St Andrews has appeared in or been referenced by a number of popular media works, in film and literature.

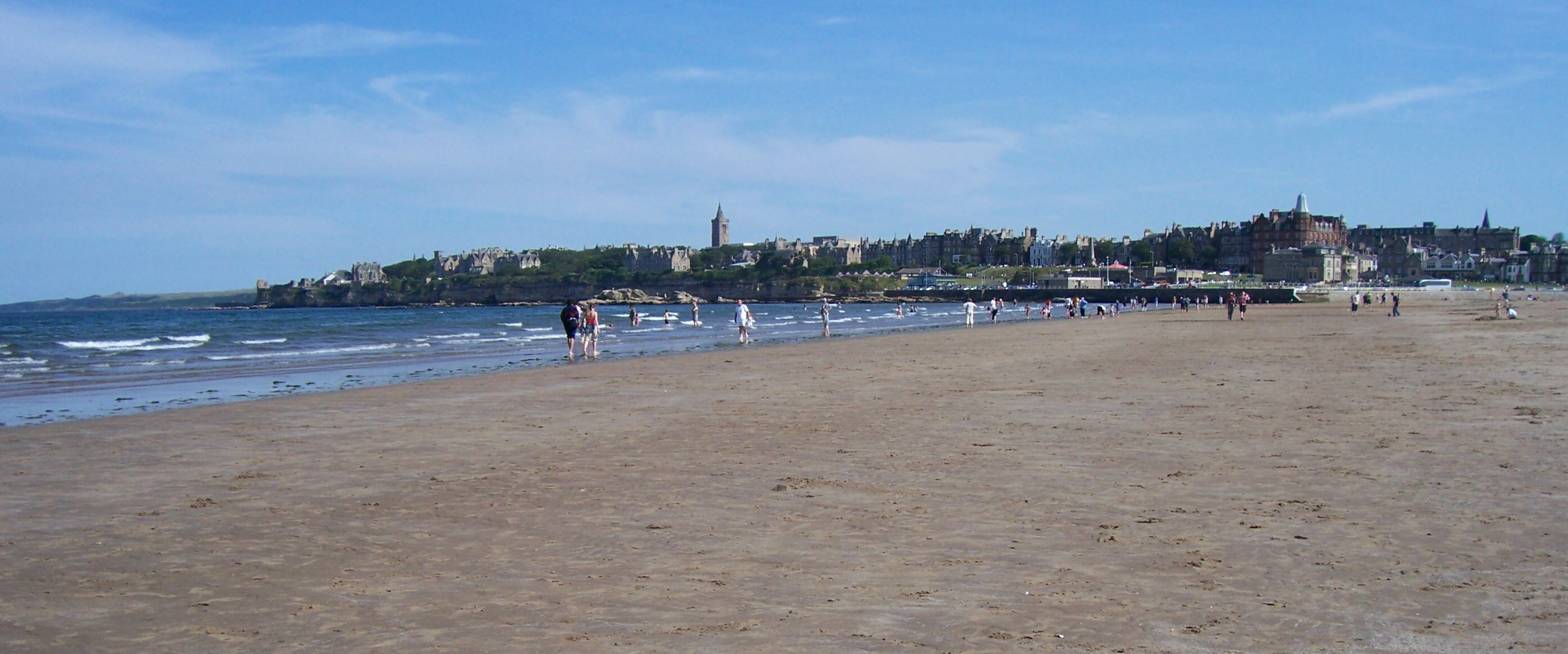
View of St Andrews from the West Sands

=== Literature ===
- John Wesley's journals recorded his 1776 visit to St Andrews and commented on evidence of the town and university's post-reformation decline.
- Samuel Johnson's travel narrative A Journey to the Western Islands of Scotland (1775), features the author's visit to the town and university.
- James Boswell's The Journal of a Tour to the Hebrides with Samuel Johnson, LL.D. (1785) discusses the university's history and ecclesiastical importance.
- Robert Fuller Murray's poetry collection, The Scarlet Gown: Being Verses by a St Andrews Man (1891), offers Victorian literary depictions of university life, including rectorial elections, professors, students, and the scarlet gown.
- Margaret Oliphant's short story, The Library Window (1896), is set at the fictional St Rule's University, which is based on the University of St Andrews.
- In Enid Blyton's Malory Towers novel series (1946–1951), and the main heroine Darrell Rivers plans to attend the University of St Andrews after Sixth Form with some of her fellow characters.
- Bruce Marshall's romance novel, Girl in May (1956), is set in St Andrews.
- Val McDermid's The Distant Echo (2003) features four St Andrews students as its protagonists.
- Adam Nevill's horror novel, Banquet for the Damned (2004), takes place in St Andrews.
- Shirley McKay's historical crime fiction novel Hue and Cry (2009) is in St Andrews in 1579 and explores university life.
- In Jenny Han's young adult novel, To All the Boys I've Loved Before (2014), and film adaptation (2018), the protagonist's older sister moves from Virginia to study at St Andrews.
- Jay Parini's memoir, Borges and Me (2020), recounts the author's time as a doctoral student at the university and road trip from St Andrews to the Highlands with Jorge Luis Borges.

=== Film and television ===
- St Andrews was used as a location for the film Chariots of Fire (1981). The opening scene, featuring several characters running along West Sands, has become widely recognised as one of the most famous scenes in British film history.
- The university's Andrew Melville Hall was used for location shooting of the film adaptation (2010) of Kazuo Ishiguro's novel, Never Let Me Go starring Keira Knightley and Carey Mulligan.
- The crime drama Karen Pirie (2022), based on Val McDermid's The Distant Echo, was set and filmed in St Andrews.
- Season 6 (2023) of the The Crown covered Prince William and Catherine Middleton's years at the university, was filmed in part at across various locations in St Andrews.

== See also ==
- Category:Academics of the University of St Andrews
- Chancellor of the University of St Andrews
- St Andrews Cathedral
- List of medieval universities
- Gaudy
- Town and gown

== Sources ==
- R.G. Cant The University of St Andrews, A Short History (Oliver and Boyd Ltd. 1946)
