= School of Physics and Astronomy, University of St Andrews =

School of Physics and Astronomy of the University of St Andrews
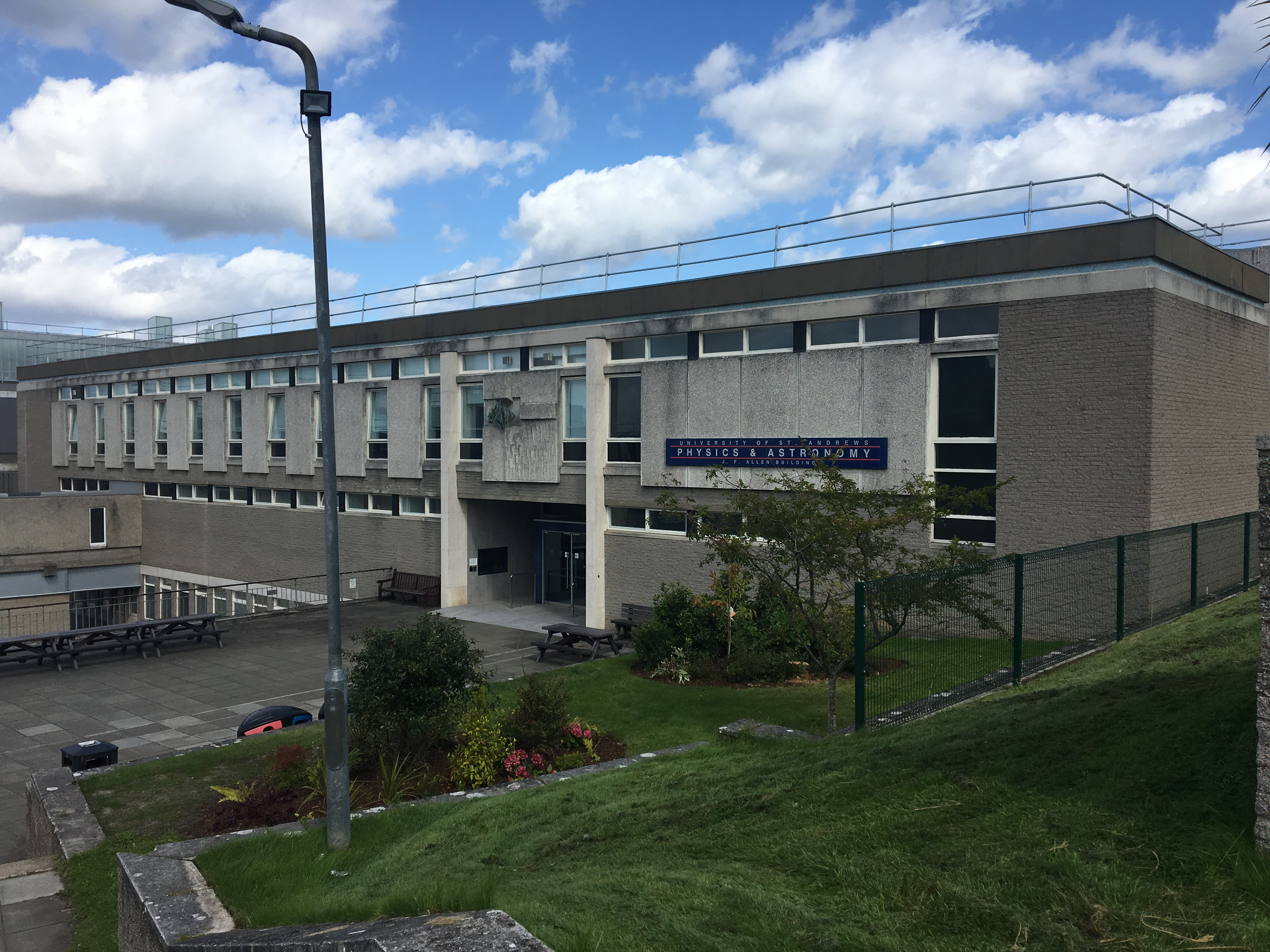
- Head of School: Professor Jonathan Keeling
- Campus: North Haugh, St Andrews, Scotland
- Website: www.st-andrews.ac.uk/physics-astronomy/

The School of Physics and Astronomy at the University of St Andrews is an academic department dedicated to the teaching, research, and dissemination of knowledge in the fields of physics and astronomy. Located on the North Haugh in the historic town of St Andrews, in Fife, Scotland, the school is part of the oldest university in Scotland and the third-oldest in the English-speaking world.

== History ==
Physics and astronomy have been studied and taught for more than 350 years at the University of St Andrews. Mathematical and astronomical work was integral to the medieval curriculum, and notable figures such as James Gregory, inventor of the Gregorian telescope, held positions at the university. Over the centuries, the disciplines evolved into formal departments within the university. Sir David Brewster worked at the university on optical materials and the polarisation of light, and became principal of the university.

More recently, John F Allen was chair of natural philosophy at the university, laying the foundations for a still very active group investigating the properties of matter at cryogenic temperatures, and installing Scotland's first helium liquefier. The school still operates Scotland's only helium liquefier. During John Allen's time in St Andrews, the North Haugh site was purchased by the university, where the current building of the school is located. The physics department moved to this location in 1965; the building is now named after John F. Allen.

While originally physics and astronomy were taught in separate departments, they were merged in 1987 into the present School of Physics and Astronomy. Today, the school continues a long tradition of inquiry as a leading center for physics and astronomy research.

In 2017, the school was awarded Juno Champion status by the Institute of Physics, and shortly after an Athena SWAN Silver award.

== Teaching ==
The school strives to provide an education of the highest quality for both undergraduate and postgraduate students, developing the skills and knowledge for a successful career in industry, business or academia. It has modern teaching facilities and a better than average student-to-staff ratio, with all undergraduate degrees accredited by the Institute of Physics. The school has regularly been highly placed in university league tables. For example, from 2017 to 2021 the Guardian University league table had the school four times at number one and once at number two in the UK.

The school's teaching portfolio includes the following courses:

- Bachelor in Science (BSc) in Astrophysics
- Master in Physics (MPhys) in Astrophysics
- BSc in Physics
- MPhys in Physics
- MPhys in Theoretical Physics

In addition, it offers the following joint degrees:

- BSc in Physics and Mathematics
- BSc in Physics and Philosophy
- MPhys in Theoretical Physics and Mathematics
- Master in Science (MSci) in Physics and Chemistry

The MPhys/MSci degrees are four to five year degrees, whereas the BSc programmes three to four year degrees. PhD and EngD students in the school benefit from a wide range of technical and skills courses within the Graduate School of the Scottish Universities Physics Alliance (SUPA), with some postgraduate students also trained within discipline-specific Doctoral Training Centres.

== Research ==
The School of Physics and Astronomy is internationally recognized for its research in its priority areas, including:

- Astrophysics: Study of star and galaxy formation, exoplanets, and cosmology.
- Photonics: Exploration of light–matter interactions, laser physics, and photonics-based devices.
- Condensed Matter and Materials Physics: Investigations of novel materials, superconductivity, and quantum phenomena.

Research groups often collaborate with external partners and participate in national and international consortia, such as the Scottish Universities Physics Alliance (SUPA).

== Observatories and Telescopes ==
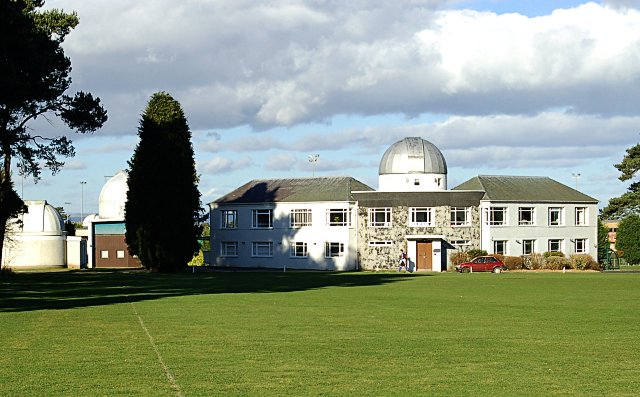
Observatory of the University

The school maintains telescopes and observing facilities for both research and education, including the Gregory telescope, the largest operating optical telescope in the UK. The school also owns three one-metre robotic telescopes within the Las Cumbres Observatory Global Network. Collaborative agreements with external observatories and space agencies further expand the reach of the department's astronomical research.

== Cleanrooms and Laser Labs ==
For photonics and materials research, the school operates two cleanrooms and specialized laser labs. These cutting-edge environments allow scientists to fabricate and study materials under precisely controlled conditions.

== Materials growth and characterization ==
As part of the Centre for Designer Quantum Materials, the school hosts an integrated ultra-high vacuum system with multiple angle-resolved photoemission systems and molecular beam epitaxy systems with in-vacuo transfer of samples to dedicated ultra-low vibration laboratories housing a suite of bespoke low temperature scanning tunneling microscopes.

== Notable current and former staff and alumni ==
- John F Allen
- Sir Michael Berry
- Sir David Brewster
- Andrew Collier Cameron
- Frank Close
- J. C. Séamus Davis
- Robert Balson Dingle
- James Gregory
- Moira Jardine
- Rosemary Hutton
- Natalia Korolkova
- Thomas F Krauss
- Ulf Leonhardt
- Peter Littlewood
- Andrew Peter Mackenzie
- Arthur Maitland
- David A. B. Miller
- Patience Mthunzi-Kufa
- Miles Padgett
- Wilson Sibbett
