= John F. Allen (physicist) =

Canadian physicist (1908–2001)

John F. Allen FRS FRSE
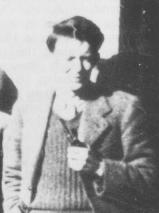
- Allen in March 1949.
- Born: John Frank Allen; May 5, 1908; Winnipeg, Manitoba, Canada
- Died: April 22, 2001 (aged 92); Elie, Fife, Scotland
- Education: University of Manitoba; University of Toronto
- Known for: Superfluid phase of matter
- Scientific career
- Fields: Physics
- Workplaces: University of St Andrews
- Doctoral advisor: John McLennan

John Frank Allen, FRS FRSE (May 5, 1908 – April 22, 2001) was a Canadian physicist. At the same time as Pyotr Leonidovich Kapitsa in Moscow, Don Misener and Allen independently discovered the superfluid phase of matter in 1937 using liquid helium in the Royal Society Mond Laboratory in Cambridge, England.

== Life ==
Allen was born in Winnipeg; he was also known as Jack Allen. His father, Frank Allen, was a professor in physics at the University of Manitoba. John Allen studied physics initially at the University of Manitoba, where he received his bachelor's degree in 1928. Afterwards, he went to the physics department of the University of Toronto to pursue postgraduate studies. He obtained his master's degree in 1930 and undertook his PhD working with John McLennan about superconductivity. He there developed and built his first cryostat which was taken by John McLennan for a demonstration of superconductivity in a public lecture to the Royal Institution in London. He obtained his PhD degree in 1933. With a two-year US National Research Council Fellowship which he obtained in 1933, he went to work as a postdoctoral researcher at Caltech between 1933 and 1935. In 1935, he joined the Mond Laboratory of the Royal Society in Cambridge to work with Pyotr Kapitsa on low temperature experiments. However, Kapitsa could not return from a visit of his mother in the Soviet Union in 1934 and never returned to Cambridge. So John Allen worked independently of Kapitsa on properties of helium at very low temperatures and published reports on the discovery of superfluidity in helium which were published side by side in Nature in January 1938. Despite the independent discovery at about the same time, the Nobel prize for Superfluidity was awarded only to Kapitsa in 1978.

He stayed in Cambridge until 1947, when he took up an appointment as a professor in natural philosophy at the University of St Andrews, Scotland in 1947.

In 1949, he was elected a Fellow of the Royal Society. During his tenure at the University of St Andrews, he was twice dean of the Faculty of Science, and oversaw the creation of a separate Faculty of Applied Science at Dundee as well as the development of the Science complex on the North Haugh in St Andrews, which opened in 1966.

He was chair of the Very Low Temperature Commission of the International Union of Pure and Applied Physics from 1966 to 1969 and member of the British National Committee for Physics of the Royal Society.

In 1978, he retired, retaining emeritus status until his death. He died in St Andrews in Fife of a stroke.

Allen received an honorary doctorate from Heriot-Watt University in 1984. The building of the School of Physics and Astronomy of the University of St Andrews is named after John Allen, as is the library in the J.F. Allen building.

Allen died of a stroke on 22 April 2001.

== Family ==
Allen married his wife, Elfriede Hiebert, in 1933. The two divorced later. They had one adopted son.

== Scientific work ==
During his work on low temperature physics, Allen developed a number of techniques that are still in use today. In 1937, he introduced the O-ring for use as a seal for vacuum systems. He further invented in 1947 indium gaskets to create leak tight seals for low temperature applications.

In 1937, Allen discovered superfluid helium together with his student Don Misener in the Mond laboratory in Cambridge, independent of Pyotr Kapitsa in Moscow. His student, Ernest Ganz, later observed the second sound in liquid helium, and Allen and his collaborator possibly also measured the third sound that occurs in thin films, however they did not report their results. When World War II broke out and he worked on projects supporting the army. During World War II, this included the development of on-board oxygen generators for bombers, and a variable time fuse for anti-aircraft shells.

Allen also used a movie camera to film his experiments, such as the superfluid helium fountain, which he discovered in 1938 with the help of a pocket flashlight. Over a ten-year period Allen made a movie of the various two-fluid phenomena exhibited by liquid helium-4. The photography of these effects was a real challenge, because liquid helium-4 is essentially transparent. This unique colour movie (the fifth edition was completed in 1982) is one of Allen's great legacies to physics. His was an early user of moving images to document experiments and inform students and the general public.

At some stage (likely in 1984) he modified the long-running St. Andrews pitch drop experiment to bring its setup closer to that of the University of Queensland's similar pitch-drop experiment.

== Pictorial biography ==
Commendations of John Frank Allen
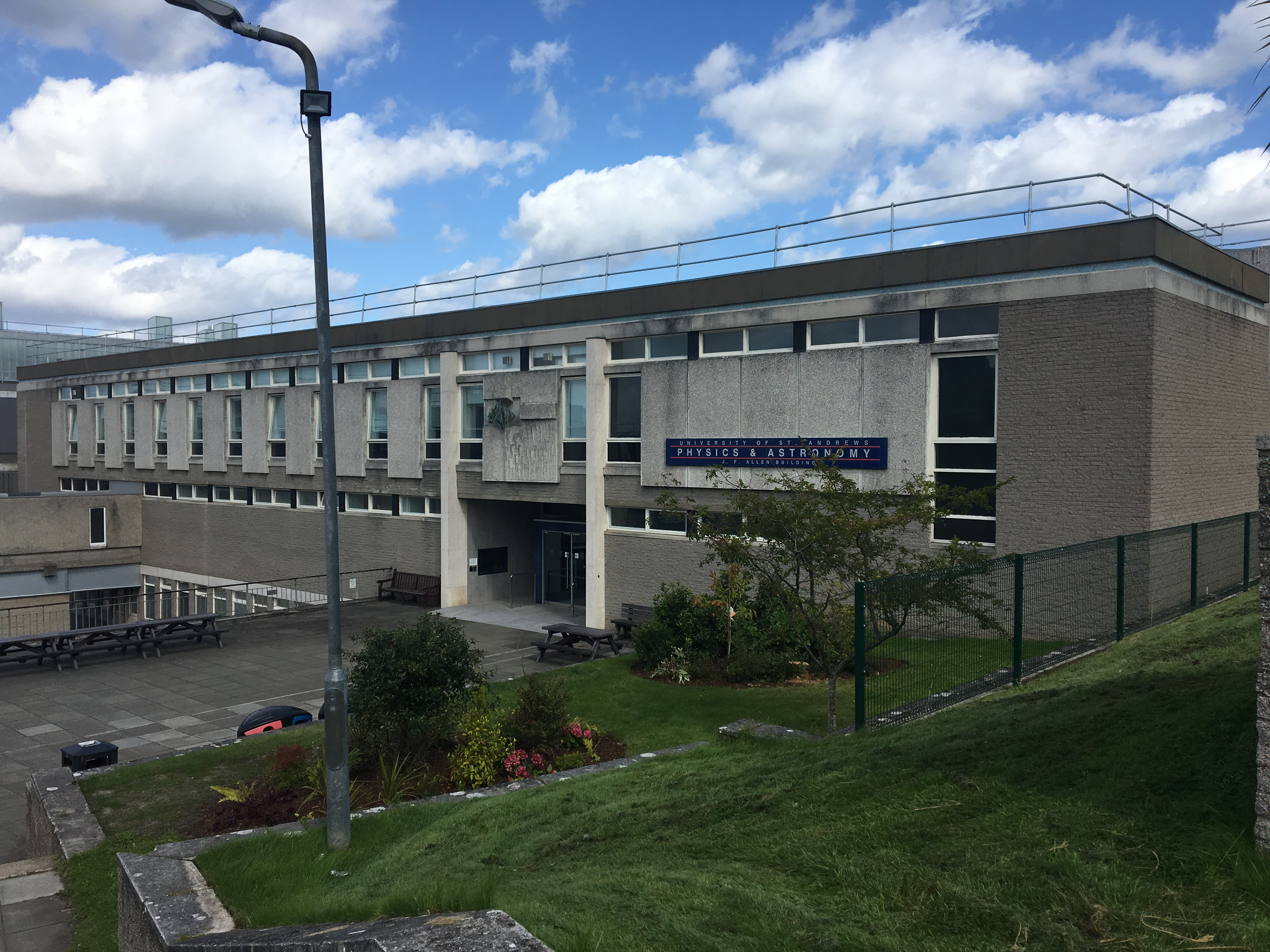
J F Allen building, hosting the School of Physics and Astronomy of the University of St Andrews

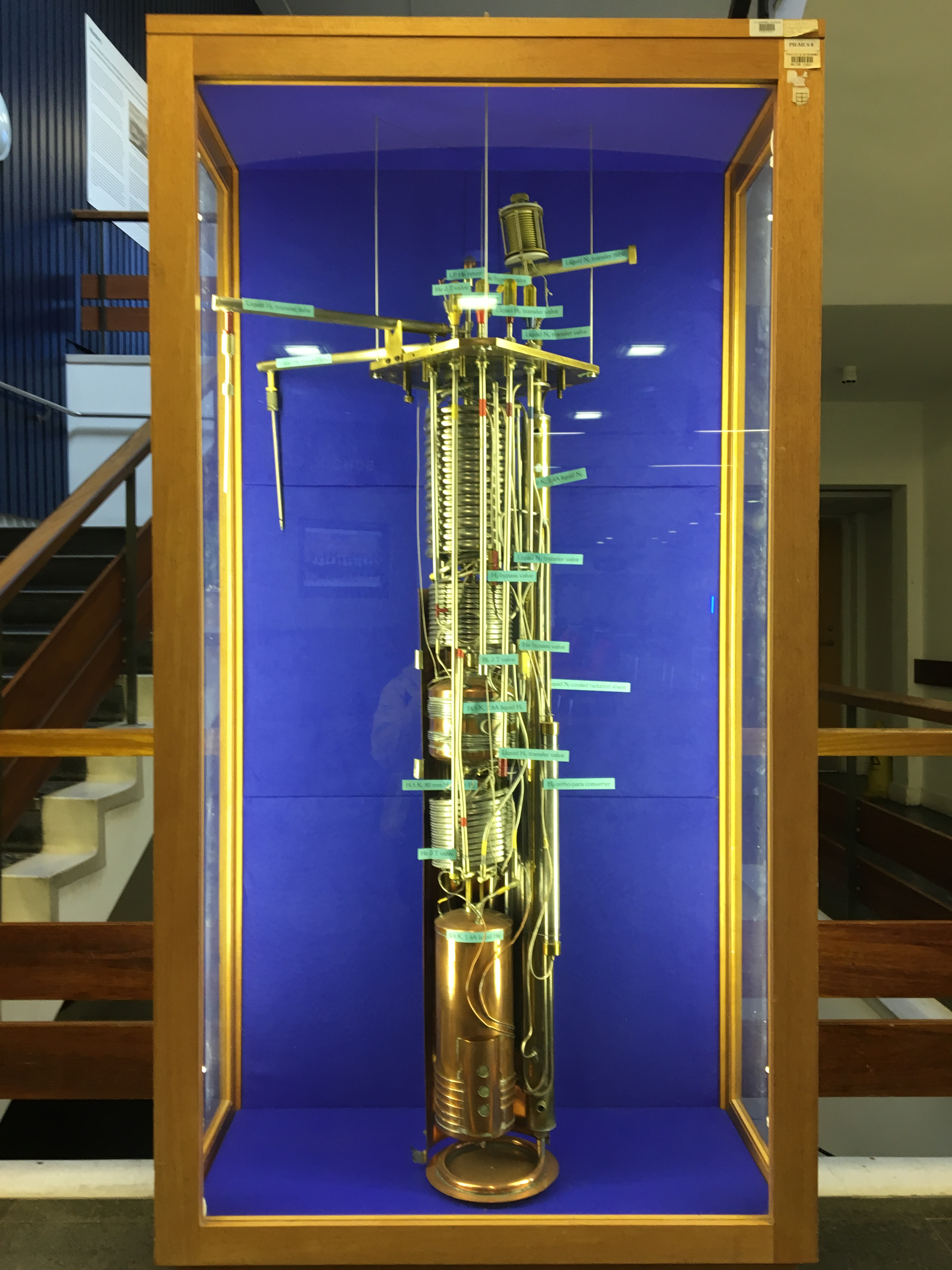
Helium liquifier built by John F. Allen in 1952 at the University of St Andrews

== See also ==
- Timeline of low-temperature technology
- Griffin, Allan (1999). "A Brief History of Our Understanding of BEC: From Bose to Beliaev". arXiv:cond-mat/9901123. Bibcode:1999cond.mat..1123G.
- John Allen's video on superfluid helium
