= Agnes Blackadder Hall =

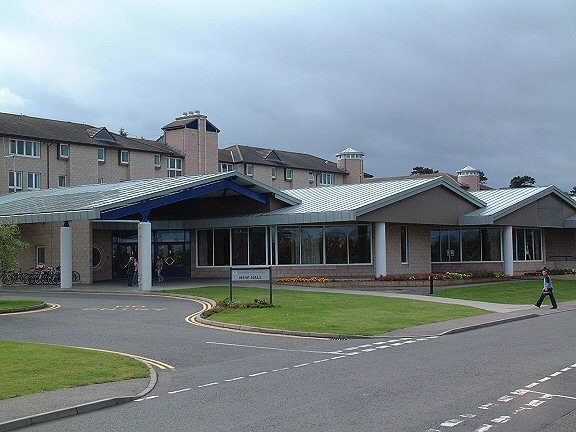
- The main entrance to Agnes Blackadder Hall
- Interactive map of the Agnes Blackadder Hall area
- Former names: New Hall

General information
- Type: Student residence
- Architectural style: Modern architecture
- Location: North Haugh; St Andrews; Fife; KY16 9XW, St Andrews, Fife, Scotland
- Coordinates: 56.3405°N 2.8140°W
- Completed: 1993
- Owner: University of St Andrews

Website
- Agnes Blackadder Hall

Agnes Blackadder Hall (formerly New Hall) is the largest single-building Hall of Residence owned by the University of St Andrews. It was opened in 1993 and is located in the town of St Andrews, Fife, Scotland. It has 519 bedrooms, of which 25 are shared. All are en-suite. Previously it was the only Hall in St Andrews to accommodate both catered and self-catered students, and catered students were in the significant majority. It currently provides residence for both catered and non-catered students.

== Naming ==
The name 'New Hall' was initially intended to be purely a temporary one. As the hall was opened at a time when the university had just celebrated the centenary of women's admission, it was mooted that the hall would be named for Elizabeth Garrett Anderson as one of the most famous women to attend the university. A mass meeting of the hall's residents was held to discuss the matter, and gather suggestions for the hall's permanent name. However, no name was ever decided upon by the university authorities, and it remained 'New Hall' by default from 1993 until 2012.

Following a vote amongst students, on 17 April 2012 it was announced that New Hall would be renamed 'Agnes Forbes Blackadder Hall' from the 2012-13 session onwards, known informally as 'ABH', 'Blackadder Hall' or simply 'Blackadder'. Agnes Forbes Blackadder (1875-1964) is notable as the University of St Andrews' first female graduate, who received her MA on 29 March 1895. She went on to achieve great eminence through a distinguished medical career as a consultant dermatologist in London, one of the first women to be appointed in such a capacity in a hospital which was not exclusively for women. The new name, coincidentally or otherwise, reflects the significant population of medical students in residence due to the Medical School being relatively nearby.

The new name was officially adopted during a naming ceremony at the hall on 15 October 2012. A large painting of Agnes Forbes Blackadder, commissioned by the ABH Committee now stands in the foyer of the hall, painted by local artist Keith Proven.

== Architecture ==
Blackadder is laid out in a series of blocks overlooking quads. The main entrance to hall sits at the centre of these blocks, with the main facilities such as the reception, residence staff and Wardennial Team offices, café (the Forbes), common room (games room), dining hall, Prayer Room, Music Room and IT suite focused in this area. There are four floors, along which study bedrooms (both single and shared occupancy) run along an extensive network of corridors which span from the centre of hall outwards to the left and the right. Roughly ten students each share kitchen facilities which are commonly on the end of each sub-section of corridor.

== Location ==
Blackadder is located on the North Haugh area of St Andrews, the only part of the university or town that could realistically be described as 'campus'. It overlooks a large grass area, with flats used for playing football or rugby. The field is at its best in spring and summer when the sun is shining and the daffodils are out. It is a 15-minute walk from town.

The North Haugh is shared by some parts of the Faculty of Science, including the Purdie Building, the Biochemistry Building and the Mathematics Dept, the new Medical School, as well as Andrew Melville Hall, another university residence. Past Andrew Melville Hall there is an unnamed lake, which is inhabited by swans and ducks.

== Facilities ==
Blackadder has its own café area, the Forbes, which is open to students 24 hours a day. The Forbes was open after its major renovation and upgrade project in Summer 2015. The café also serves as the main social area of the hall. In the same area there is a laundry room. There is also a games room. Adjacent to the Warden's Office is the music room, which is a small soundproof room for residents to practise in. In addition, there is an IT Suite/ Study Room on the ground floor, a multi-functional room on the second floor, and a Prayer Room on the third floor.

== As a Hotel ==
Blackadder Hall is a 3-star hotel during the summer months, catering for parents and graduates during graduation, golfers and other tourists. The few shared rooms are marketed as 'family rooms'. It boasts a 'Green Tourism' award for its sustainable practices.

== Catering Services ==
Catering was temporarily ceased from the 2011–2012 academic year. However, during the summer months when the hall is converted into hotel use, the two common rooms are converted back into the original Dining Room which is large, modern, and relaxed.

Due to popular demand, as of the 2015–2016 session Blackadder is a partially catered hall, accommodating around 100 catered students, while the rest are on non-catered contracts.

== Influence of Prince William ==
When Prince William, Duke of Cambridge first announced that he intended to attend the university, applications to study at St Andrews almost tripled. Many of (then-named) New Hall's bedrooms were converted to accommodate more students, including the installation of bunk beds in single rooms and converting study rooms into additional bedrooms.

As pressure for space eased, the bunk beds were replaced with double beds, and single rooms are no longer shared, though the converted study rooms are still in use.
