= James Clerk Maxwell Medal and Prize =

Institute of Physics James Clerk Maxwell Medal & Prize
- Awarded for: Exceptional early-career contributions to theoretical (including mathematical and computational) physics
- Sponsored by: Institute of Physics
- Presented by: Institute of Physics
- First award: 1962

The James Clerk Maxwell Medal and Prize is awarded by the Institute of Physics (IOP) in theoretical physics. The award is made "for exceptional early-career contributions to theoretical (including mathematical and computational) physics." It was awarded every two years between 1962 and 1970 and has since been awarded annually. It is named in honour of James Clerk Maxwell.

The first medal was awarded in 1962 to Abdus Salam. Past recipients include subsequent Nobel Prize in Physics laureates (Abdus Salam, David Thouless, Anthony James Leggett, John Michael Kosterlitz) and Lucasian Professors of Mathematics (Stephen Hawking, Michael Green, and Michael Cates).

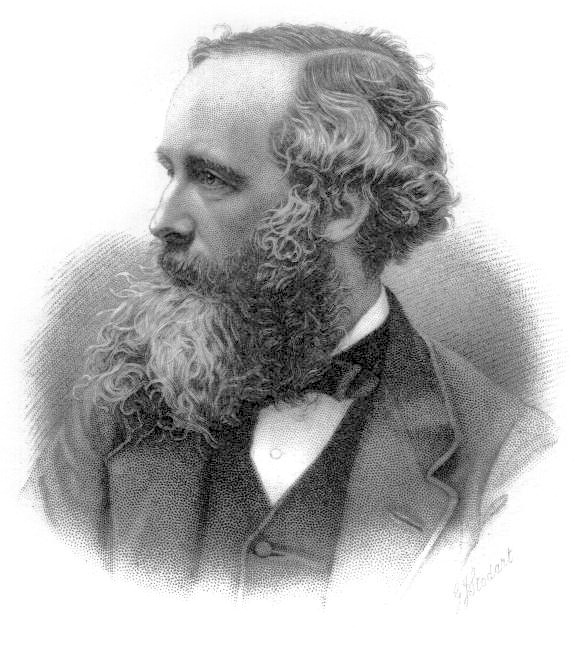
James Clerk Maxwell (1831 – 1879)

== Recipients ==
- 1962 Abdus Salam
- 1964 Walter Charles Marshall
- 1966 Richard Henry Dalitz
- 1968 Roger James Elliott and Kenneth William Harry Stevens
- 1970 Richard John Eden
- 1971 John Bryan Taylor
- 1972 Volker Heine
- 1973 David James Thouless
- 1974 Samuel Frederick Edwards
- 1975 Anthony James Leggett
- 1976 Stephen William Hawking
- 1977 Eric Jakeman
- 1978 Michael Victor Berry
- 1979 Christopher Hubert Llewellyn Smith
- 1980 David James Wallace
- 1981 John Michael Kosterlitz
- 1982 Jonathan Richard Ellis
- 1983 Alastair Douglas Bruce
- 1984 David William Bullett
- 1985 Alan John Bray and Allan Peter Young
- 1986 James Binney
- 1987 Michael Boris Green
- 1988 Robin C Ball
- 1989 Mark Warner
- 1990 George Petros Efstathiou
- 1991 Michael E Cates
- 1992 Neil Turok
- 1993 John Feather Wheater
- 1994 Stephen Mark Barnett
- 1995 Artur Konrad Ekert
- 1996 Michael Christopher Payne
- 1997 Michael Wilkinson
- 1998 Andrew James Fisher
- 1999 Jeffrey Robert Forshaw
- 2000 Andrew Martin Steane
- 2001 Benjamin Simons
- 2002 Andrew John Schofield
- 2003 Tchavdar Nikolov Todorov
- 2004 Martin Bodo Plenio
- 2005 Clifford Victor Johnson, "For his outstanding contribution to string theory, quantum gravity and its interface with strongly coupled field theory; in particular for his work on understanding the censorship of singularities, and the thermodynamic properties, of quantum spacetime."
- 2006 Ruth Gregory, "For her contributions to physics at the interface of general relativity and string theory, in particular for her work on the physics of cosmic strings and black holes."
- 2007 Nigel Cooper, "For his work on topological excitations in quantum Hall fluids and related systems, in particular rotating Bose-Einstein condensates."
- 2008 Sougato Bose, "For his work on the characterisation and exploitation of entanglement in quantum systems, in particular for his work on the propagation of information in spin chains."
- 2009 Dmitry Skryabin, "For his contributions to theory and modelling of nonlinear optical processes; in particular for predictions and understanding of effects accompanying interaction of solitons with radiation and generation of ultrabroad spectra in optical fibers."
- 2010 Peter Haynes, "For his work on linear-scaling methods for large-scale first-principles simulation of materials based on density-functional theory, in particular his leading role in the development of the ONETEP code used in both academe and industry."
- 2011 Andrei Starinets, "For his contributions to our understanding of the transport properties of systems of strongly coupled quantum fields."
- 2012 Meera Parish, "For her pioneering work in the theory of cold fermionic matter and magnetotransport in highly disordered media."
- 2013 Joanna Dunkley, "For her contributions to determining the structure and history of our Universe."
- 2014 Igor Lesanovsky, "For his outstanding contributions to the theory of control and manipulation of quantum systems, particularly his pioneering studies of highly excited 'Rydberg' states in cold atomic gases."
- 2015 Clare Burrage, "For her contributions to dark energy research, in particular to the development of methods of testing for fifth forces from astrophysical probes through to atom interferometry experiments."
- 2016 Alexandra Olaya-Castro, "For her contributions to the theory of quantum effects in biomolecular systems – in particular, to the understanding of exciton-vibration interactions and the emergence of nontrivial quantum behaviour in photosynthetic complexes."
- 2017 Marcin Mucha-Kruczynski, "For outstanding contributions to the understanding of graphene, in particular groundbreaking studies that have addressed its optical properties, lattice deformations, electronic structure, and electron transport."
- 2018 Hannah Price, "For her important contributions to the nascent fields of topological atomic and optical physics, including collaboration with world-leading experimental groups in their observation of new effects."
- 2019 Adam Nahum, "For his outstanding contributions to understanding universal aspects of many-body quantum systems both in and out of equilibrium."
- 2020 Curt von Keyserlingk, "For remarkable discoveries in non-equilibrium physics, including the discovery of new families of driven phases of matter, and revealing the unexpected manner in which information spreads in quantum many-body systems."
- 2021 Bartomeu Monserrat, "For exceptional contributions to the development of computational techniques that bring temperature to modern electronic structure methods, and their application to topological materials, photovoltaics, superconductors and planetary physics."
- 2022 Katy Clough, "For pioneering the use of advanced computational methods to investigate fundamental physics, achieving groundbreaking research in inflationary cosmology and dark matter, and demonstrating outstanding leadership in computational physics."
- 2023 Nikolas Breuckmann, "For outstanding contributions to the quantum error correction field, particularly work on proving the no low-energy trivial state conjecture, a famous open problem in quantum information theory."
- 2024 Frank Schindler, "For numerous conceptual contributions to condensed matter physics; in particular, the prediction of higher-order topological insulators, novel quantum materials whose lossless edge states promise energy-efficient microelectronics in the post-silicon age."
- 2025 Ana-Maria Raclariu, "For several groundbreaking contributions to (3+1)-dimensional asymptotically flat spacetimes, particularly, the discovery of novel connections between asymptotic symmetries in gravity and gauge theories, scattering observables and two-dimensional conformal field theories."
- 2026 Katja Klobas, "For discovering new methods to exactly characterise the dynamics of interacting many-body systems and microscopically explain emergent non-equilibrium phenomena."
