= Peter Littlewood =

British physicist (1955–2026)

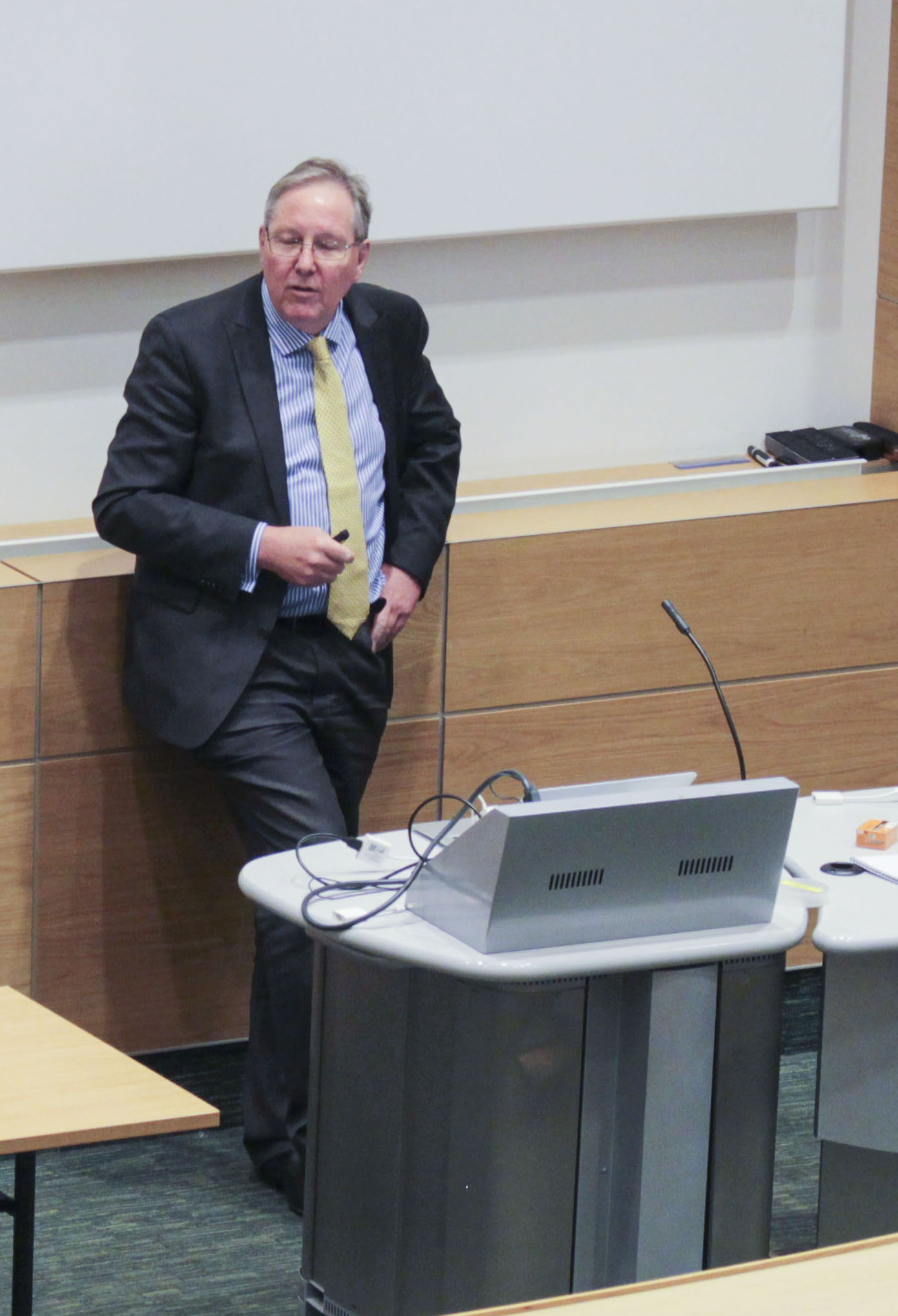
- Born: 18 May 1955
- Died: 15 June 2026 (aged 71); Chicago, Illinois, U.S.
- Education: University of Cambridge
- Known for: polariton condensation, correlated oxides
- Scientific career
- Fields: Condensed matter physics
- Workplaces: Argonne National Laboratory; University of Chicago; University of St Andrews
- Doctoral advisor: Volker Heine
- Notable students: Pinaki Majumdar; Meera Parish
- Website: www.anl.gov/contributors/peter-b-littlewood

Peter Brent Littlewood, FRS (18 May 1955 – 15 June 2026) was a British physicist and academic who was Professor of Physics at the University of Chicago. He was the 12th Director of Argonne National Laboratory. He previously headed the Cavendish Laboratory as well as the Theory of Condensed Matter group and the Theoretical Physics Research department at Bell Laboratories. Littlewood served as the founding chair of the board of trustees of the Faraday Institution from 2018 to 2024.

== Life and career ==
Littlewood was born on 18 May 1955. He gained a first-class degree in Natural Sciences at the University of Cambridge in 1976, and was then awarded a Kennedy Scholarship to work at the Massachusetts Institute of Technology for two years. Littlewood returned to Cambridge in 1977 to complete his PhD.

Beginning in 1980, he worked at Bell Labs, finishing his time there as head of the theoretical physics research after assuming the position in 1992. He continued to be a member of technical staff until 2001.

In 1997, he became a professor at the Cavendish Laboratory in Cambridge, and was head of the Theory of Condensed Matter group, and served as Matthias Scholar at Los Alamos National Laboratory during a 2003-04 sabbatical. In 2005, he returned to Cambridge to become head of the Cavendish Laboratory, before being named in 2011 the Associate Laboratory Director for Physical Sciences and Engineering at the Argonne National Laboratory. On 25 March 2014, Littlewood was named to the director's post. In January 2017, he retired as director to resume his research at the University of Chicago. Since 2022, he also held a partial appointment at the School of Physics and Astronomy of the University of St Andrews in Scotland, UK. Peter Littlewood held various advisory roles at Faraday Institute and Flatiron Institute.

Littlewood held six patents, published more than 200 articles in scientific journals and gave more than 200 invited talks at international conferences, universities and laboratories.

Littlewood died in Chicago on 15 June 2026, aged 71.

== Honours and positions ==
From his curriculum vitae, 2010.

- Member, National Academy of Sciences, 2025
- Fellow, Royal Society of London, 2007
- Fellow, Institute of Physics, 2005
- Matthias Scholar, Los Alamos National Laboratory, 2003-2004
- Consultant, Los Alamos National Laboratory, 2004-
- Consultant, National High Magnetic Field Laboratory, 2004-
- Fellow, Trinity College Cambridge, 1997
- Fellow, American Physical Society, 1989
- Distinguished Member of Technical Staff, AT&T Bell Laboratories, 1989
- Professeur Associé and visiting scientist, CNRS, Grenoble, 1986
- Denman Baynes Student, Clare College, Cambridge 1979-80
- Kennedy Scholar, Massachusetts Institute of Technology, 1976–77
- Senior Scholar, Trinity College Cambridge, 1974–76

== Work ==
Littlewood's research variously included studying the phenomenology and microscopic theory of high-temperature superconductors, transition metal oxides and other correlated electronic systems, and the optical properties of highly excited semiconductors. He applied his methods to engineering, including holographic storage, optical fibers and devices, and new materials for particle detectors.

Littlewood was also involved in research related to magnetic 2D materials.
