= Andrew Fisher (physicist) =

British physicist (born 1965)

Andrew James Fisher
- Born: 1965 (age 60–61)
- Known for: Nanophysics and Quantum Physics research
- Awards: Maxwell Prize

Andrew James Fisher is Professor of Physics in the Department of Physics and Astronomy at University College London. His team is part of the Condensed Matter and Materials Physics group, and based in the London Centre for Nanotechnology (a joint venture between UCL and Imperial College, London).

== Research ==
His research area is in understanding the behaviour of electrons in nanostructures. Predicting the behaviour of electrons using quantum mechanics theory, to compare with experimental data. Current funded project topics include:

- Quantum de-coherence and computation in condensed-phase systems
- Electrons in atomic-scale quantum wires
- Formation of molecules on interstellar dust grains
- Theory of scanning tunnelling microscopy in liquids
- Development of techniques to study coherent inelastic transport
- Organic molecules on semiconductor surfaces

== Awards ==
- Maxwell Medal and Prize, Institute of Physics, 1998

== Education and career ==
He was educated at Abingdon School from 1976 until 1983 before going to Clare College, Cambridge. Fisher lectured at UCL from October 1995. Previously he lectured at Durham University (1993–1995).

He was a Junior Research Fellow at St John's College Oxford, working in the Clarendon Laboratory of the Oxford Physics Department (1989–1993). During this period he spent a year at the IBM Zurich Research Laboratory (1991–1992).

== Personal life ==
Fisher is a violinist and is married to Alison Smart, a classical singer. He has two sons, Thomas and Hugh.

== Bibliography ==
Selected articles

- Wu, W; Fisher A.J (2 January 2008), "Exchange between deep donors in semiconductors; A quantum defect approach", Physical Review B, 77 (4) 045201, arXiv:0709.0268, Bibcode:2008PhRvB..77d5201W, doi:10.1103/physrevb.77.045201, ISSN 1098-0121, OCLC 280148433, S2CID 118666019
- Lin H.-C; Fisher A.J (25 July 2008), "Local entanglement of multidimensional continuous-variable systems", Physical Review A, 78 (1) 012349, arXiv:0711.3735, Bibcode:2008PhRvA..78a2349L, doi:10.1103/physreva.78.012349, ISSN 1050-2947, OCLC 281347025, S2CID 118653711
- Avellino, M; Fisher, A J; Bose, S (2006), "Quantum information - Quantum communication in spin systems with long-range interactions", Physical Review, 74 (1) 12321, arXiv:quant-ph/0603148, Bibcode:2006PhRvA..74a2321A, doi:10.1103/physreva.74.012321, ISSN 1050-2947, OCLC 102328072, S2CID 14687540
- Fisher, AJ (2003), "Quantum computing in the solid state; the challenge of decoherence", Philosophical Transactions of the Royal Society A, 361 (1808): 1441–50, Bibcode:2003RSPTA.361.1441F, doi:10.1098/rsta.2003.1213, PMID 12869320, S2CID 16680416
- Briggs, G A D; Fisher, A J (1999), "STM experiment and atomistic modelling hand in hand; individual molecules on semiconductor surfaces", Surface Science Reports, Surface science reports, v. 33, nos. 1/2, 33 (1), Amsterdam: 1, Bibcode:1999SurSR..33....1B, doi:10.1016/S0167-5729(98)00004-1, OCLC 42522937
- Binney, J J; Dowrick, N J; Fisher, A J; Newman, M E J (1998), The theory of critical phenomena; an introduction to the renormalization group, Oxford science publications, Clarendon Press, ISBN 978-0-19-851393-3, OCLC 440655670
- Blöchl, P E; Joachim, C; Fisher, A J; North Atlantic Treaty Organization. Scientific Affairs Division (1993), Computations for the nano-scale, NATO ASI series., Series E,, Applied sciences; no. 240., Dordrecht, ISBN 978-0-7923-2360-0, OCLC 28150644

== See also ==
- List of Old Abingdonians
