= Katy Clough =

British astrophysicist and computational cosmologist

Katy A. Clough is a British astrophysicist and computational cosmologist. Her research uses numerical relativity to simulate the formation and development of the large-scale structures in the early universe; she has been described as "a world leader in the use of numerical methodology to probe the validity of cosmic inflation". She is an STFC Ernest Rutherford Research Fellow in the School of Mathematical Sciences at Queen Mary University of London.

== Education and career ==
Clough studied at the University of Oxford, where she earned a master of engineering degree in 2006. After working in finance as an accountant and technical manager, she began studying physics through the Open University, earning a bachelor's degree in 2013, and went on for a Ph.D. in the Department of Theoretical Particle Physics and Cosmology at King's College London in 2017. Her dissertation, Scalar Fields in Numerical General Relativity: Inhomogeneous Inflation and Asymmetric Bubble Collapse, was supervised by Eugene A. Lim; it was published in the Springer Theses book series after a nomination as an outstanding doctoral dissertation by King's College.

From 2018 to 2021 she was a postdoctoral researcher at Oxford, in the Beecroft Institute for Particle Astrophysics and Cosmology, also serving as a lecturer in physics in St Edmund Hall, Oxford. She moved to Queen Mary University of London as STFC Ernest Rutherford Research Fellow in 2021.

== Recognition ==
Clough was the 2022 recipient of the James Clerk Maxwell Medal and Prize of the Institute of Physics, given "for pioneering the use of advanced computational methods to investigate fundamental physics, achieving groundbreaking research in inflationary cosmology and dark matter, and demonstrating outstanding leadership in computational physics".
