= Eric Priest =

British mathematician (born 1943)

Eric Priest FRSE FRS
- Born: Eric Ronald Priest; 7 November 1943 (age 82)
- Education: University of Leeds
- Scientific career
- Thesis: Magnetohydrodynamic neutral point theory (1970)
- Doctoral advisor: Thomas Cowling
- Doctoral students: Philippa Browning; Alan Hood; Moira Jardine
- Website: risweb.st-andrews.ac.uk/portal/en/persons/eric-ronald-priest(2257f726-4269-430b-9ea1-5d9aabbf0af7).html

Eric Ronald Priest FRSE FRS (born 7 November 1943) is Emeritus Professor at St Andrews University, where he previously held the Gregory Chair of Mathematics and a Bishop Wardlaw Professorship.

== Career and research ==
Priest is a recognised authority in solar magnetohydrodynamics (or MHD for short), the study of the subtle, and often nonlinear, interaction between the Sun's magnetic field and its plasma interior or atmosphere, treated as a continuous medium. Priest is an applied mathematician and, along with the other members of his research group at St Andrews, is currently investigating a large number of solar phenomena, including sunspots, coronal heating, wave propagation, magnetic reconnection, magnetic instabilities, magnetic structures and helioseismology. This is done using mathematical modelling techniques and observational data from satellites such as SoHO, Yohkoh and TRACE, or ground-based observatories such as Kitt Peak and Big Bear. In 2000 he was the James Arthur Prize Lecturer at Harvard University. Professor Priest has received a number of academic awards for his research, including Hale Prize of the American Astronomical Society (2002), and was elected a Fellow of the Royal Society in the same year. He is notable in the solar physics community as something of an evangelist for the importance of magnetic reconnection in driving many solar phenomena, and as an explanation of the solar coronal heating problem.

As an applied mathematician, his research interests involve constructing mathematical models for the subtle and complex ways in which magnetic fields interact with plasmas in the atmosphere of the Sun and in more exotic cosmic objects. In particular, he is trying to understand how the corona of the Sun is heated to several million degrees and how magnetic energy is converted into other forms in solar flares.

In the area of science and religion, he considers himself aware of the importance of trying in small ways to encourage dialogue and understanding between Islam and Christianity and recently spoke on science and culture to 850 schoolchildren in Alexandria, Egypt. He has also preached in St Andrews on the tensions between Christianity and science and spoke on "Creativity in Science" at a conference on Creativity and the Imagination. He is active in the local Anglican church and enjoys hill-walking, bridge, singing in a couple of choirs and spending time with his wife Clare and four children.

Priest retired from full-time teaching in 2010, and was awarded a two-year Leverhulme Emeritus Fellowship in 2011. He retains a link with St Andrews as Emeritus Professor in the School of Mathematics and Statistics and remains active in research.

In 2020, Priest received from the European Physical Society the prestigious ESPD Senior Prize for "long-standing leadership via mentoring, supervising and field-defining textbooks and for fundamental contributions in key topics of solar magnetohydrodynamics, particularly magnetic reconnection in the solar atmosphere and solar coronal heating."

=== Recent selected publications ===
- Priest, E.R. (2006) 'Our enigmatic Sun', Recent Advances in Astronomy and Astrophysics (ed N. Solomos) American Institute of Physics, Melville USA.
- Priest, E.R. (2006) 'Creativity in science', Proc. Conf. on Creativity and Imagination (ed. T Hart)
- Priest, E.R. and Forbes, T.G. (2002) 'The magnetic nature of solar flares', Astron. and Astrophys. Rev. 10, 313–377
- Priest, E.R., Heyvaerts, J.F. and Title, A.M. (2002) 'A Flux Tube Tectonics Model for solar coronal heating driven by the magnetic carpet', Astrophys. J., 576, 533–551
- Priest, E.R. and Forbes, T.G. (2000) Magnetic Reconnection: MHD Theory and Applications, Cambridge University Press, Cambridge.
- Priest, E.R. (1982) Solar Magnetohydrodynamics, D. Reidel, Holland

=== Awards and honors ===
- James Arthur Prize Lecturer at Harvard University (2000)
- George Ellery Hale Prize of the American Astronomical Society (2002)
- Elected a Fellow of the Royal Society (FRS) in 2002
- Gold Medal for Astrophysics of the Royal Astronomical Society (2009)
- Cecilia Payne-Gaposchkin Medal and Prize (2009)
- Fellow of the Norwegian Academy of Science and Letters
- Doctor of Science honoris causa, University of St Andrews (2013)
