= Philippa Browning =

British physicist

Philippa Browning FInstP
- Born: Philippa K. Browning
- Education: Millfield
- Alma mater: University of Cambridge (BA); University of St Andrews (PhD)
- Awards: Chapman Medal (2016); Hannes Alfvén Prize (2026)
- Scientific career
- Fields: Astrophysics; Solar physics
- Workplaces: University of Manchester; University of Manchester Institute of Science and Technology
- Thesis: Inhomogeneous magnetic fields in the solar atmosphere
- Doctoral advisor: Eric Priest
- Website: www.jodrellbank.manchester.ac.uk/people/staff-spotlights/philippa-browning

Philippa K. Browning FInstP is a Professor of Astrophysics in the Jodrell Bank Centre for Astrophysics at the University of Manchester. She specialises in the mathematical modelling of fusion and solar plasmas.

== Early life and education ==
Browning was educated at Millfield and studied the Mathematical Tripos at the University of Cambridge, graduating in 1979. She completed Part III of the Mathematical Tripos in 1980. She was inspired by Yuri Gagarin to work in astrophysics. For her graduate studies Browning joined the University of St Andrews working with Eric Priest. She submitted her thesis on Inhomogeneous Magnetic Fields in the Solar Atmosphere in 1984.

== Research and career ==
After completing her PhD Browning worked as a postdoctoral researcher with Eric Priest. She studied coronal loops, finding they were a balance of magnetic tension forces, buoyancy and pressure gradients. Her work covered the fundamentals of flux tubes. Browning was appointed a lecturer at University of Manchester Institute of Science and Technology (UMIST) in 1985. She joined the University of Manchester in 2004, where she works on the interactions between plasmas and magnetic fields. She is particularly interested in solar flares. In 2009, Browning was promoted to professor at the Jodrell Bank Centre for Astrophysics. She served as editor of the Journal of Geophysical Research from 2010 to 2013. She contributed to the book Multi-scale Dynamical Processes in Space and Astrophysical Plasmas. She continues to study coronal heating. In January 2026, Browning announced her retirement from Manchester, after more than four decades of teaching and research at the institution.

In 2013 Browning was made chair of the Institute of Physics Plasma Physics Committee and the Solar Physics Council. Through the Solar Physics Council, Browning is a mentor for young solar physicists. In 2014 Browning arranged two-day meeting to discuss coronal heating at the Royal Society.

As of 2018 Browning is working on the Solar Orbiter and Parker Solar Probe. Browning has appeared at the Bluedot Festival. She discussed her work on solar flares and their interaction with the earth. She has taken part in the Manchester Science Festival. Browning serves on the Institute of Physics Women in Physics advisory panel.

=== Awards and honours ===
Browning was awarded the Chapman Medal by the Royal Astronomical Society in 2016. The medal recognised her "pioneering work on energy release by magnetic relaxation in stressed coronal magnetic fields". In 2017 she was awarded a Science and Technology Facilities Council (STFC) research grant to explore particle acceleration in twisted magnetic fields. She was elected a Fellow of the Institute of Physics (FInstP). Browning was the 2026 recipient of the Hannes Alfvén Prize of the European Physical Society Plasma Physics Division, given for "innovative results that bridge astrophysical and laboratory plasmas".
