= Meera Parish =

Australian physicist

Meera Marjorie Parish is an Australian quantum condensed-matter physicist whose research involves the behavior of ultracold systems, including Fermionic condensates, Bose–Einstein condensates, superconductivity, superfluidity, and magnetotransport. She is a professor and ARC Future Fellow in the School of Physics and Astronomy at Monash University.

== Education and career ==
Parish is the daughter of Chris Parish, an immunology professor at Australian National University. After secondary school at Narrabundah College in Canberra, Parish studied physics at Australian National University, graduating with first class honours in 2001. She went to Pembroke College, Cambridge in England for doctoral study in physics, completing her Ph.D. in 2005. Her dissertation, Magnetoresistance of inhomogeneous semiconductors, and, ultracold atomic Fermi gases, was supervised by Peter Littlewood.

After postdoctoral research as a Junior Research Fellow at Churchill College, Cambridge, and then at Princeton University in the US from 2006 to 2009, she returned to Cambridge in 2009 as an EPSRC Career Acceleration Fellow. By 2012 she had moved to the London Centre for Nanotechnology of University College London. She took her present position at Monash University in 2015. While an associate professor in 2020, she was named as an ARC Future Fellow.

Between 2017 and 2024, Parish was a chief investigation of the Australian Research Council Centre of Excellence in Future Low Energy Electronics Technologies.

== Research ==
Parish is a theoretical physicist studying materials with many-body quantum properties.

As of November 2026, Parish had over 8000 citations and a H-index of 47.

In 2026, Parish and colleagues discovered a new form of matter known as a "quantum droplet."

== Recognition ==
Parish was a 2012 recipient of the James Clerk Maxwell Medal and Prize of the Institute of Physics, given "for her pioneering work in the theory of cold fermionic matter and magnetotransport in highly disordered media".
