= Agnes Forbes Blackadder =

Scottish medical doctor (1875–1964)

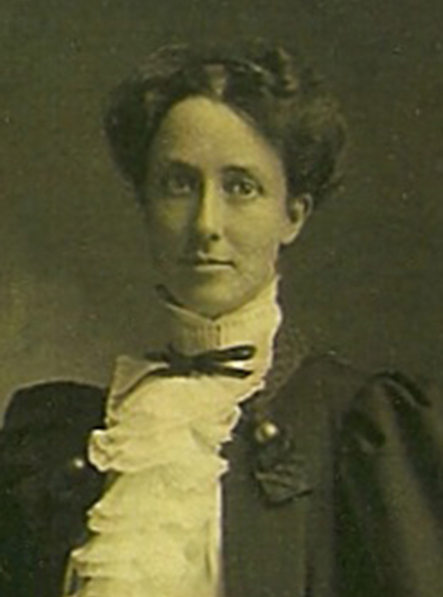
- Blackadder in 1894
- Born: 4 December 1875; Broughty Ferry, Dundee, Scotland
- Died: 12 May 1964 (aged 88); London, England
- Education: University of St Andrews, University of Glasgow
- Spouse: Thomas Dixon Savill (m. 1901; died 1910)
- Awards: Fellow of the Royal College of Physicians of Ireland
- Scientific career
- Fields: Medicine (dermatology, radiography)

Agnes Forbes Blackadder Savill (4 December 1875 – 12 May 1964) was a Scottish medical expert and doctor, sometimes regarded as a polymath. Blackadder became the first female graduate of the University of St Andrews when she gained her M.A. degree on 29 March 1895.

She was the first consultant dermatologist to be appointed in 1907 at St. John's Hospital, an appointment which was also notable as one of the first appointments of a woman consultant at a hospital that was not exclusively for women. During World War I, she served as a radiographer at the Scottish Women's Hospital at Royaumont in France and pioneered radiography of gangrene.

Throughout her career she also contributed to the women's suffrage and integrating the music therapy into medical treatment.

== Early life ==
Agnes Blackadder was born in Broughty Ferry, Dundee, on 4 December 1875, the daughter of Robert Blackadder, a Dundee architect and engineer. She spent most of her early life around Dundee, living in Bellevue, West Ferry and attending the High School of Dundee.

Blackadder gained her M.A. degree from the University of St Andrews in 1895, becoming the first female graduate of the university. She continued her education at the University of Glasgow where she gained both MBChb (1898) and M.D. (1901). Whilst in Glasgow, she won the first prize in Practical Pathology in 1896 and received First Class Certificates in Materia Medica, Surgery, Midwifery, Ophthalmology, and Insanity and a Second Class Certificate in Anatomy. After graduating, she married Dr. Thomas Dixon Savill at the Church of St Mary Magdalene in Forfarshire in 1901.

== Career ==
After graduation, Blackadder moved to London where she became a consultant in dermatology and electro-therapeutics as well as working in radiology. She became a member of the Royal College of Physicians of Ireland in 1904 and was appointed as a consultant for St. John's Hospital for Skin Diseases and the South London Hospital for Women and Children.

In 1912, Blackadder was one of three doctors who studied the effects of force-feeding on suffragists who went on hunger strikes during their imprisonment and published medical papers on the subject.

During World War I, Blackadder served as a radiologist at the Scottish Women's Hospital at Royaumont, France, returning to her position in London whenever there was a lull in the fighting. She used a state-of-the-art X-ray car which had been given to the hospital, and used this to understand and alleviate the effects of gas gangrene through prompt diagnosis and treatment.

While serving at Royaumont, Blackadder borrowed a pianola from Paris and installed it at the hospital. She noticed that both patients and staff benefited from playing it and listening to it and she later wrote a book about the importance of music to well-being. The book, Music, Health and Character, was published in 1923. It led to the establishment of the Council for Music in Hospitals.

After the war, Blackadder returned to London and continued to practice medicine. She edited her husband's textbook, Savill's System of Clinical Medicine, which she completed in 1942. She also became interested in ancient history and in 1955, she published Alexander the Great and his Times.

== Death and legacy ==
Blackadder died in London on 12 May 1964. In 2012, students of the University of St Andrews voted to honour Blackadder by renaming a hall of residence Agnes Blackadder Hall, formerly New Hall. The hall is the first at St Andrews to be named after a woman.
