= Thomas Cowling =

English astronomer

- Born: 17 June 1906; Hackney, London, England
- Died: 16 June 1990 (aged 83); Leeds, West Yorkshire, England
- Education: Brasenose College, Oxford
- Awards: Hughes Medal (1990)
- Scientific career
- Thesis: The radiative equilibrium of a spherical mass of gas (1931)
- Doctoral advisor: Edward Arthur Milne
- Doctoral students: Eric Priest

Thomas George Cowling FRS (17 June 1906 – 16 June 1990) was an English astronomer.

== Early life and education ==
Cowling was born in Hackney, London, the second of four sons of George Cowling and Edith Eliza Cowling (née Nicholls). He was educated at Sir George Monoux Grammar School in Walthamstow and read mathematics at Brasenose College, Oxford from 1924 to 1930. From 1928 to 1930 he worked under Edward Arthur Milne. In 1929, Milne had no problems left to ask his student to work on and appealed to Sydney Chapman, who proposed that they work on an article on which he was working that dealt with the Sun's magnetic field. Cowling found an error in the paper that invalidated Chapman's results. After Cowling's doctorate, Chapman proposed that they work together.

== Academic career ==
In 1933 Cowling wrote an article, The magnetic field of sunspots. Joseph Larmor had worked in this area, arguing that sunspots regenerate themselves through a dynamo effect. Cowling showed that Larmor's proposed explanation was incorrect. His article assured him of a good reputation in the field of astrophysics.

During the 1930s, Cowling also worked on stellar structure involving radiation and convection, at the same time as Ludwig Biermann but independently of him. He constructed a model of star with a convective core and radiative envelope, named the Cowling model by Chandrasekhar. He also studied magnetic fields within stars and classified the modes of non-radial oscillation of the body of a star, the basis of the field of helioseismology.

Cowling became an Assistant Lecturer at the University College of Swansea (now Swansea University) in 1933. He was subsequently a lecturer at the University of Dundee (1937–38) and at the University of Manchester (1938–45) before being appointed Professor of Mathematics at the University College of North Wales (now Bangor University). In 1948 Cowling was appointed Professor of Applied Mathematics at the University of Leeds in succession to Professor Selig Brodetsky. Cowling retired from his chair at Leeds in 1970 with the title emeritus professor.

== Honours ==
Cowling was elected a fellow of the Royal Society (FRS) in March 1947. He won the Gold Medal of the Royal Astronomical Society in 1956 and the Bruce Medal of the Astronomical Society of the Pacific in 1985. He was elected president of the Royal Astronomical Society from 1965 to 1967. He was also awarded the Hughes Medal two days before his death.

== Marriage and children ==
Cowling married Doris Marjorie Moffatt in 1935. They had a son and two daughters.

== Death ==
Cowling died in Leeds on 16 June 1990, one day before his 84th birthday. He was survived by his wife and children.
