= Thomas Dixon Savill =

British physician and writer

- Born: 7 September 1855; Kensington
- Died: 10 January 1910 (aged 54); Algiers
- Occupations: Physician, writer
- Spouse: Agnes Forbes Blackadder (m. 1901)

Thomas Dixon Savill (7 September 1855 – 10 January 1910) was a British physician and writer.

== Biography ==
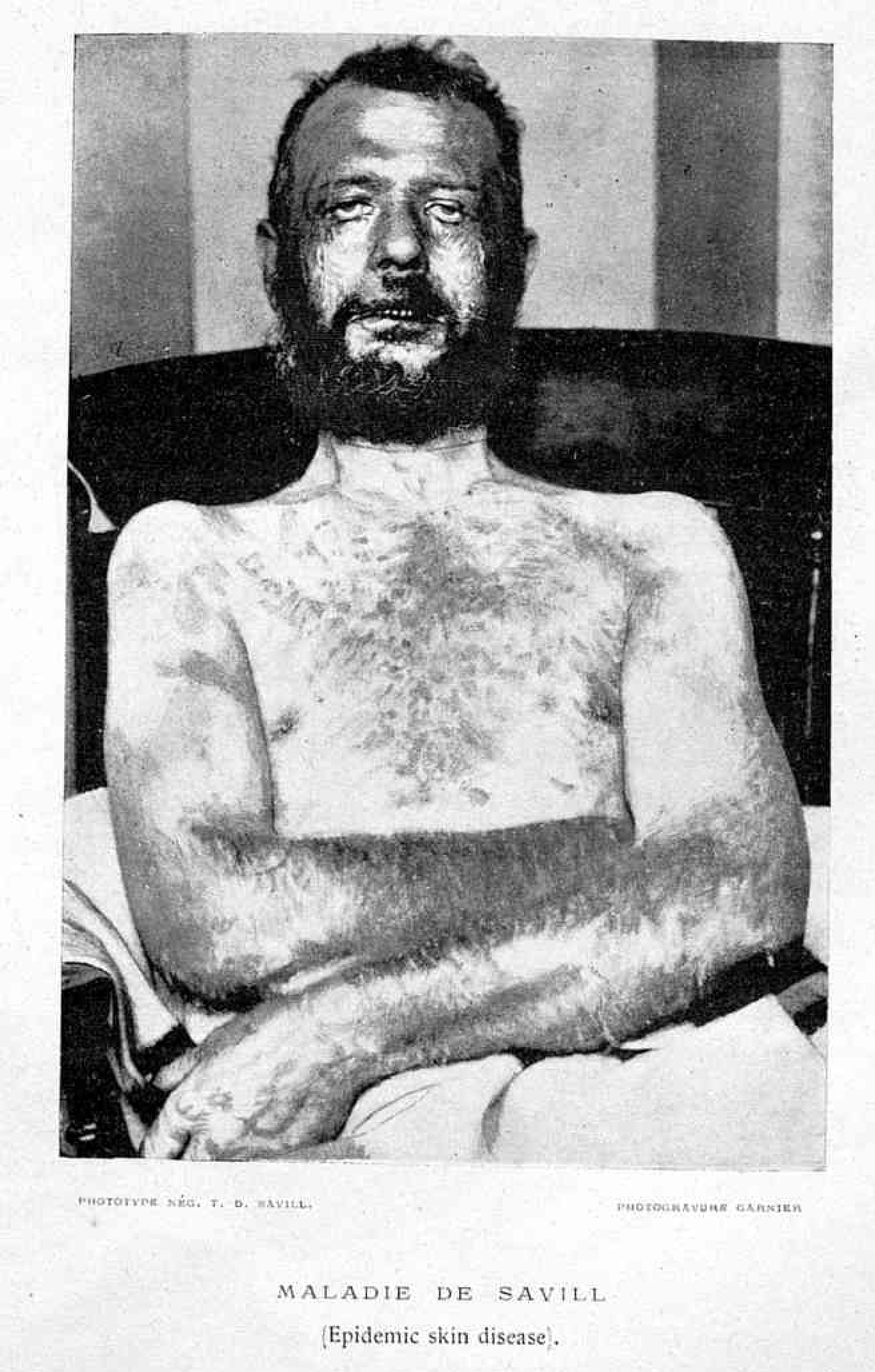
Savill's disease (Nouvelle iconographie de la Salpêtrière, 1895).

Savill was born in Kensington. He received his early education at the Stockwell grammar school, and, having chosen the profession of medicine, entered St. Thomas's Hospital with a scholarship in natural science. Here he had a distinguished career, gaining the William Tite scholarship and many prizes. He continued his medical studies at St. Mary's Hospital, at the Salpêtrière in Paris, at Hamburg, and at Vienna. In 1881 he graduated M.B. of the University of London, proceeding M.D. in the following year, and being admitted a member of the Royal College of Physicians of London. In rapid succession he became registrar, pathologist, and assistant physician to the West London Hospital, and early showed a bent towards neurology by translating in 1889 the lectures of Professor Charcot on Diseases of the Nervous System.

In 1885 he was appointed medical superintendent of the Paddington Infirmary. He was president of the Infirmary Medical Superintendents' Society, and was recognised as an authority on many of the questions raised in both the majority and minority reports of the Poor Law Commission in 1909. Much of his medical experience as medical superintendent was embodied in his chief work, A System of Clinical Medicine (2 vols. 1903–5). Savill also made a reputation as a dermatologist, and was appointed in 1897 physician to St. John's Hospital for Diseases of the Skin. Meanwhile, he had retired in 1892 from Paddington Infirmary to become a consulting physician, mainly with a view to pursuing his study of neurology. He was soon appointed physician to the West End Hospital for Diseases of the Nervous System. In 1899 he brought out a course of clinical lectures upon Neurasthenia (originally delivered at the Paddington Infirmary and the West End Hospital). The book showed Savill to be an original thinker and clear expositor.

He married in 1901 Dr. Agnes Forbes Blackadder, then assistant and later full physician to St. John's Hospital for Diseases of the Skin. She aided her husband in his book on Clinical Medicine. Besides the works mentioned, Savill contributed, mainly to The Lancet (1888-1909), many papers upon neurological and dermatological subjects. Another valuable piece of work was the Report on the Warrington Small-Pox Outbreak, 1892-3.

== Death ==
Savill died at Algiers on 10 January 1910 from a fracture of the base of the skull caused by a fall from his horse.

== Selected publications ==
- Clinical Lectures on Neurasthenia (1906)
- A System of Clinical Medicine (1909)
