= Don Misener =

Canadian physicist (1911–1996)

Don Misener (A.D. Misener) (1911–1996) was a physicist. Along with Pyotr Leonidovich Kapitsa and John F. Allen, Misener discovered the superfluid phase of matter in 1937.

Misener was a graduate student at the University of Toronto in 1935. He joined Allen at Cambridge University in about 1937. Misener later returned to Canada to work at the University of Western Ontario.

== Journal references ==
- E. F. Burton, J. O. Wilhelm, and A. D. Misener, Trans. Roy. Soc. Can. 28(111) p. 65 (1934)
- J. F. Allen and A. D. Misener, Flow of Liquid Helium II, Nature 141(3558) p. 75 (8 Jan 1938) doi:10.1038/141075a0
- A. D. Misener, The Specific Heat of Superconducting Mercury, Indium and Thallium, Proceedings of the Royal Society of London. Series A, Mathematical and Physical Sciences, 174(957) pp. 262–272 (1940) doi:10.1098/rspa.1940.0018

== See also ==
- Timeline of low-temperature technology
- Allan Griffin A Brief History of Our Understanding of BEC: From Bose to Beliaev arXiv:cond-mat/9901123 p. 5
