= Moira Jardine =

British astrophysicist

Moira Jardine FRSE
- Born: Moira Mary Jardine
- Education: University of St Andrews (PhD)
- Spouse: Andrew Collier Cameron
- Awards: Suffrage Science award (2019)
- Scientific career
- Workplaces: University of St Andrews; University of Sussex
- Thesis: Steady models for magnetic reconnection (1989)
- Doctoral advisor: Eric Priest
- Website: star-www.st-and.ac.uk/~mmj/

Moira Mary Jardine FRSE is a British astrophysicist with an interest in young stars, particularly the structure of their magnetic fields and coronae, and the mechanisms by which they interact with their disks and planets. She was promoted to a Personal Chair in 2012, making her the first female professor of Physics at the University of St Andrews.

== Education ==
Jardine was educated at the University of St Andrews where she was awarded a PhD in 1989 for research investigating steady state models of magnetic reconnection supervised by Eric Priest.

== Career and research ==
Jardine's research has been a journey through the Solar System, outwards from the Sun to other stars. She began by studying the Sun, and moved on to other stars when she joined her husband, Andrew Collier Cameron, at the University of Sussex. In 1996, the pair transferred to the University of St Andrews, where they remain, with Jardine's research now focussing on magnetic activity of young suns.

Jardine chaired the 2008 Cool Stars Conference Cool Stars, Stellar Systems, and the Sun, hosted at the University of St Andrews. This was the first time this conference was held in the United Kingdom, and around 350 international astronomers were in attendance.

As a member of the Science Advisory Board of the Leibniz Institute for Astrophysics Potsdam, she supports collaboration with other research institutes and advises on research and development programmes.

Recently, Jardine has joined the editorial board of Living Reviews in Solar Physics as an associate editor.

Jardine's research is summarised as:

"By studying solar-like stars and their impact on orbiting planets, Moira aims to understand the origins of our solar system and the conditions that allowed life to evolve on Earth. In particular, she studies the magnetic fields of stars, since these power both the hot, X-ray-emitting corona and the supersonic wind that together can ionise or erode a planet’s atmosphere. As inputs for her models, Moira uses both magnetic maps of stellar surfaces (derived from spectropolarimetry) and photometric observations from satellite missions. These data are coordinated through the international consortium MagICS".

=== Teaching ===
Jardine has taught courses focusing on magnetic fields and fluid dynamics. As well as supervising PhD students and postdocs, she currently teaches AS1001 The Solar System, PH4031 Fluids and AS5002 Magnetofluids and Space Plasmas at the University of St Andrews.

=== Awards and honours ===
The Royal Society of Edinburgh awarded her the Young Person's Award in 2002 for outreach work with young people in local schools, encouraging participation in the sciences. She was elected a Fellow of the Royal Society of Edinburgh (FRSE) in 2013.

== Personal life ==
Jardine was interviewed by the University of St Andrews Physics Society in 2016 to discuss life as an astronomer and the search for the perfect sky. In this interview, she discusses her journey through academia, her family and other subjects.

She lives in St Andrews, with her husband Andrew Collier Cameron and their three children. The couple regularly collaborate, and have been known to teach each other's classes in case of emergencies, such as the early birth of their third child.
