= Andrew Collier Cameron =

British astronomer

Andrew Cameron FRSE
- Born: Andrew Collier Cameron
- Spouse: Moira Jardine
- Awards: George Darwin Lectureship
- Scientific career
- Fields: Astronomy
- Institutions: University of St Andrews
- Website: risweb.st-andrews.ac.uk/portal/en/persons/andrew-collier-cameron(e9b0e012-48e6-4003-a427-313ec72683fb).html

Andrew Collier Cameron FRSE is a British astronomer specialising in the discovery and characterisation of exoplanets. He was a founding member of the WASP project. He is a professor at the University of St Andrews, where he served as head of the School of Physics and Astronomy between 2012 and 2015.

== Career and research ==
Cameron earned a doctoral degree from the University of Canterbury in 1982, with a thesis on southern hemisphere late-type Ca II emission-line stars. Cameron's research primarily focuses on stellar magnetic fields and the discovery and characterisation of extra-solar planets and cool stars.

In his early career, he focused on the rotational history and dynamo-generated magnetic activity of cool stars, ultimately producing micro-arcsecond resolution maps of starspot distributions and surface magnetic fields. With Dr R. D. Robinson he co-discovered the centrifugally supported "slingshot prominence" systems in the coronae of the young, rapidly rotating solar-type star AB Doradus and other similar objects.

Cameron was awarded a personal chair in 2003. He was a co-founder of the Wide Angle Search for Planets project, which was awarded the 2010 Royal Astronomical Society Group Achievement Award for its discoveries. The WASP collaboration includes several UK universities, and has discovered more than 170 gas-giant planets in close orbits about their host stars, using an array of wide-field CCD cameras. WASP detects the dips in light that occur as planets pass between the observer and the host star. Their masses are determined, and their planetary nature confirmed, using optical spectroscopy to measure the reflex motion of the host star about its common centre of mass with the planet.

Cameron is also the UK co-principal investigator of the Geneva/PHYESTA/Harvard/INAF/Belfast HARPS-North spectrograph project. He is also a team member of the ESA Characterising Exoplanets Satellite (CHEOPS), leading the Working Group on light curve analysis. As of 2018 he has over 300 research publications to his name.

Cameron also served as head of the School of Physics and Astronomy at the University of St Andrews between 2012 and 2015.

=== Teaching ===
Cameron has taught multiple undergraduate courses in observational astronomy at the School of Physics and Astronomy of the University of St Andrews including "Astronomy and Astrophysics II", "Observational Astrophysics", "Observational Techniques in Astrophysics", "Stellar Physics" and "The Physics of Nebulae and Stars II". He partially taught a module in fluid dynamics whilst his wife, Moira Jardine, was on maternity leave.

=== Awards and honours ===
Cameron was elected a Fellow of the Royal Society of Edinburgh (FRSE) in 2002, and was awarded the George Darwin Lectureship of the Royal Astronomical Society in 2012.

== Personal life ==
Cameron is married to Moira Jardine, a theoretical astrophysicist specialising in stellar magnetic fields, and with whom he has collaborated in the past. They live in St Andrews and have 3 children together - Jonathan, Heid, and Emma.
