= Andrew Melville Hall =

Coordinates: 56°20′26″N 02°49′03″W

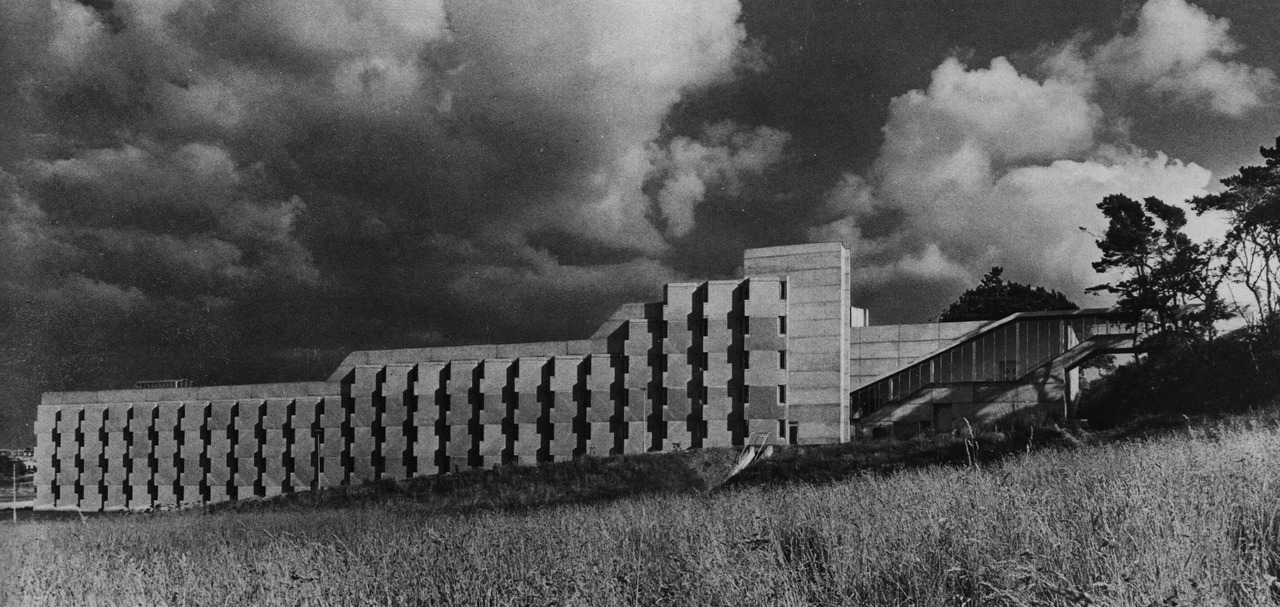
- Andrew Melville Hall in 1964

General information
- Type: Student residence
- Architectural style: Brutalist
- Location: North Haugh; St Andrews; Fife; KY16 9SU, St Andrews, Fife, Scotland
- Construction started: 1964
- Completed: 1967
- Client: University of St Andrews

Design and construction
- Architect: James Stirling

Website
- Andrew Melville Hall official website

Andrew Melville Hall is a Category A listed student hall of residence of the University of St Andrews located in St Andrews, Fife, Scotland. It was built in 1967 in the brutalist style, and it accommodates approximately 275 students.

== History ==
Designed in the New Brutalist style by the renowned architect James Stirling, Andrew Melville Hall was built during a major expansion of the University in the 1960s using prefabricated concrete modules. Errors in construction meant that extensive remedial work was required over several decades. Plans for further buildings to the same design were abandoned.

It was named after Andrew Melville, a 16th-century Scottish scholar, theologian and religious reformer who was a graduate of the University, and who later became its rector and dean of theology.

It is of a striking design and is situated prominently at the North Haugh on a ridge overlooking the St Andrews Links. The hall resembles passing ships, a common theme of the architect's style.

It has become an important architectural landmark: It was included in DoCoMoMo's 1993 list of Key Scottish Monuments and was ranked number 12 in the top 100 Scottish buildings of the last 50 years. The building was listed Category A in 2011.

Alex Salmond, a former First Minister of Scotland, stated in a speech that he had lived at Andrew Melville Hall when a student at St Andrews.

== Facilities ==
During the academic year students live in Melville, with the vast majority of these in single rooms. Every room looks out over surrounding parkland, inhabited by a large number of wild rabbits. The hall is divided into five blocks, designated A, B, C, D and E. Originally A, B and C blocks were all male and D and E blocks all female, but now C, D and E blocks are mixed, with A and B block being all male (as a general rule with few exceptions). In recent years, A block has been all male, in addition to B block.

Each block is divided up into a number of floors accessed through a central stairwell from the ground floor concourse. Typically each floor consists of sixteen study-bedrooms arranged in two groups of eight on either side of the stairwell, a number of showers/bathrooms and a pantry. The building's striking geometry is reflected in the irregular octagonal shape of the bedrooms. Blocks A, D and E have glass enclosures similar in shape to a garden greenhouse atop them to provide natural light to their stairwells; this has led to the top floor of these blocks being called "the greenhouse".

The hall itself has three common rooms in the central block, as well as a library and study room off the main concourse in E block and similarly a computer and study room at the end of A block. It is a catered residence, with three meals a day being served other than on Saturday and Sunday, when students can prepare food for themselves in the three communal kitchens which are situated on the main concourse.

While the main access to the hall is from the North Haugh, the central block's staircase leads to a path to David Russell Apartments, the nearby Sports Centre and playing fields. In the summer vacation, the residence is open for use by conferences and block bookings.

Like all residences in the University of St Andrews, it has a number of staff and students that contribute to its running. Various groups contribute to the operation and maintenance of the hall. A warden's team is responsible for student welfare, discipline, and has oversight for community development. A student committee elected by the residents, headed by the senior student, is responsible for student matters. A residence management team is responsible for the day-to-day running of the residence, including catering, house services, and maintenance.

=== In film ===
Andrew Melville Hall was used for location shooting of the film adaptation of Kazuo Ishiguro’s novel, Never Let Me Go starring Keira Knightley.

== See also ==
- List of Brutalist structures

== Sources ==
- Kenneth Frampton, Andrew Melville Hall, Architectural Design Magazine, Sept. 1970
- Andrew Melville Halls of Residence, Adrian Welch / Isabelle Lomholt, www.edinburgharchitecture.co.uk.
- St. Andrews Dormitory, The Architecture Week Great Buildings Collection.
