= North Haugh =

Part of St Andrews in Scotland

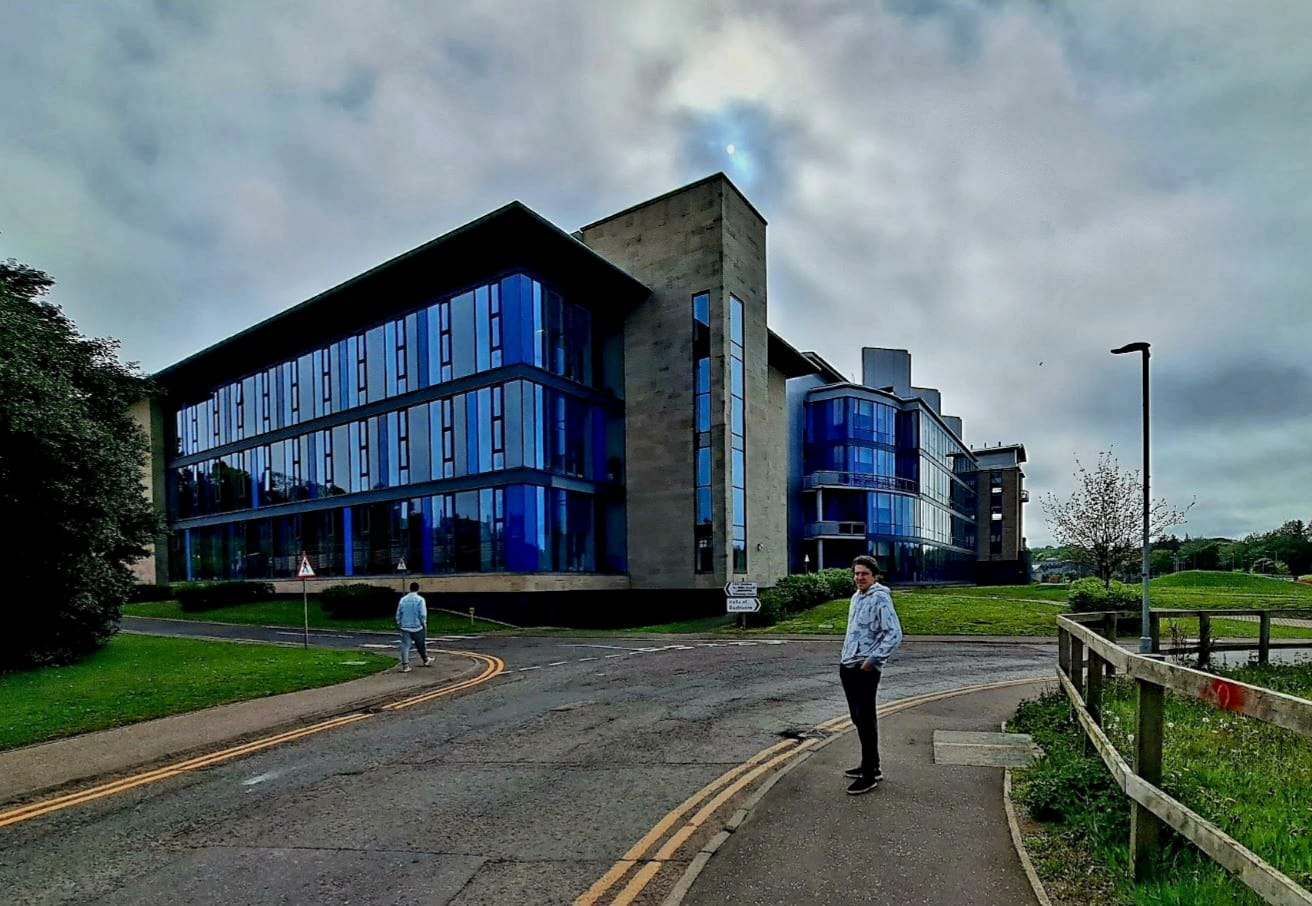
- The Biomedical Sciences Research Complex in the North Haugh campus at the University of St Andrews
- Location: St Andrews, Scotland; 56.3405°N 2.8110°W
- Location in Scotland

The North Haugh is an area in the northwestern part of the town of St Andrews in Scotland, and the location of the North Haugh campus of the University of St Andrews. The area's location near the Swilken Burn (stream) may be the origin of the name, as haugh is a Scots word meaning a low-lying meadow by the side of a river.

== Background ==
The development of the North Haugh campus began in 1960s during a major expansion of the University of St Andrews. Today it is a principal location of the natural sciences buildings and laboratories, including Chemistry, Physics, Biology, Mathematics, Computer Science, Medicine and the School of Management. The campus also includes university's biggest student residence halls–Agnes Blackadder Hall, Powell Hall, and Andrew Melville Hall.

The first building on the North Haugh campus was Andrew Melville Hall, designed by James Stirling and constructed in 1964–1967. It was the first of the initially planned four residence halls to the same design to be built on the campus, but the three others have never been constructed. Agnes Blackadder Hall (completed in 1993) and Powell Hall (completed in 2018) were built to completely different designs. Today, Andrew Melville Hall is a Category A listed building.

The North Haugh campus is within walking distance to St Andrews town centre and university buildings and facilities located on North and South Streets. It is also connected by a pedestrian walkway to Fife Park and David Russell Apartments, two student accommodation areas of the university.

Although the original Scots pronunciation of haugh is /hɔːx/, it is now mostly pronounced as /hɔː/ in the name of North Haugh in St Andrews.
