= Small (surname) =

- Pronunciation: UK: /smɔːl/ US: /smɑːl/

Origin
- Origin: Old English: "smæl"; Middle English: "smaill", "smal", "small", "smalle"
- Meaning: little or slender
- Region of origin: Great Britain

Other names
- Variant forms: Smail; Smale; Smee
- Related names: Smallbone; Smallman; Smallpage; Smallshanks

Small is an English and Scottish surname, originally used as a nickname for a person of small stature or slender build.

The name is widespread across the English-speaking world, and was sometimes adopted as an anglicised form of names with similar etymologies from other languages, including Beag in Irish, Klein and Schmal in German, Mały in Polish, and Malý in Czech and Slovak. It shares an etymology with the English surname Smallman, and has a similar etymology to the surname Smallbone, which was a nickname for a person with short or thin legs.

Notable people with the name include:

- Aaron Small (born 1971), American baseball player
- Aaron Small (canoeist) (born 2001), American sprint kayaker
- Adam Small (1936–2016), South African writer and activist
- Albion Woodbury Small (1854–1926), American sociologist
- Alexander Small (c. 1710–1794), Scottish surgeon and scholar
- Alexander Sym Small (1887–1944), British colonial administrator
- Alex and Lindsay Small-Butera (born 1986 and 1985 respectively), American animators, writers and voice actors
- Alfred T. Small (1826–1906), American sea captain
- Ambrose Small (1863– vanished 1919), Canadian theatre magnate and missing person
- Andress Small Floyd (1873–1933), American philanthropist
- Andrew Small (born 1993), British Paralympic runner
- Andrew Small (rugby union) (born 1974), New Zealand rugby union referee
- Angus Small (born 1968), South African cricketer
- Annie H. Small (1857–1945), Scottish Christian missionary and educator
- Annika Small, British businesswoman
- Anthony Small (born 1981), also known as Abdul Haq, British boxer and Islamic political activist
- Archie Small (1889–1955), English footballer
- Arthur A. Small (1933–2015), American politician and lawyer
- Barry Small, New Zealander helicopter pilot and a survivor Korean Air Flight 801
- Bertrice Small (1937–2015), American writer
- Bevan Small (born 1992), New Zealand cricketer
- Bill Small (1897–1962), Irish hurler
- Brendon Small (born 1975), American actor, composer, and musician
- Bruce Small (1895–1980), Australian businessman and politician
- Bryan Small (born 1971), English footballer
- Carlos Small (born 1995), Panamanian footballer
- Carmen Small (born 1980), American cyclist
- Cashmere Small (born 1998), known as Cash Cobain, American rapper and record producer
- Catherine Small Long (1924–2019), American politician
- Cathy Small (born 1949), American anthropologist and academic
- Catt Small, American video game developer, product designer and web developer
- Charles Small, multiple people
- Charlotte Small (1785–1857), Métis wife of explorer David Thompson
- Chris Small (born 1973), Scottish snooker player
- Chris Small (cricketer) (born 1986), New Zealand cricketer
- Christopher Small (1927–2011), New Zealand musician, writer and academic
- Clifford Small, Canadian politician
- Corey Small (born 1987), Canadian lacrosse player
- Craig Small (born 1969), Canadian artist, film director and animator
- D'Asante Small (born 1989), Bahamian politician
- Danielle Small (born 1979), Australian soccer player
- Danielle Small (cricketer) (born 1989), Barbadian cricketer
- Daniel R. Small (born 1984), American artist, filmmaker and entrepreneur
- David Small (born 1945), American writer and illustrator
- Devonte Small (born 1995), Guyanese footballer
- Donovan Small (born 1964), Jamaican football player
- Douglas W. Small (born 1965), American admiral
- Drink Small (born 1933), American musician
- Dylan Small, American statistician and academic
- Ed Small (born 1959), Canadian ice hockey player
- Ed Small (American football) (born 2006), American football player
- Edward Small (1891–1977), American film producer
- Eldridge Small (1949–2015), American football player
- Elisha Small (died 1842), American sailor
- Eric Small, American film producer, writer and director
- Eric. J. Small, American oncologist
- Ernest Gregor Small (1888–1944), American military admiral
- Ethan Small (born 1997), American baseball player
- Ethel Small, Canadian politician
- Florence Small (1860–1933), English painter
- Florence Arlene Small (1879–1916), Canadian-American murder victim
- Francis Small (1625–c. 1714), British colonial trader and landowner
- Francis Small (engineer) (1946–2021), New Zealand engineer and scouting leader
- Frank Small Jr. (1896–1973), American politician
- Fred Small, multiple people
- Geoffrey B. Small, American fashion designer
- George Small, multiple people
- Gillian Small, British biologist, university administrator and consultant
- Gladstone Small (born 1961), English cricketer
- Greta Small (born 1995), Australian alpine skier
- Hank Small (born 1947), American football coach and administrator
- Hank Small (baseball) (1953–2010), American baseball player
- Harold Small (1936–2021), Canadian politician
- Harry Small (1922–2017), English-South African rugby union footballer
- Heather Small (born 1965), British soul singer
- Helen Small (born 1964), New Zealand English professor and academic
- Henry Small, multiple people
- Irving Small (1891–1955), American ice hockey player
- Izzy Meikle-Small (born 1996), English actress
- Jabari Small (born 2002), American football player
- Jack Small (1765–1836), English cricketer
- Jack Small (footballer) (1889–1946), English footballer
- James Small, multiple people
- James Small-Edwards, British politician
- Jane Pemberton Small (c. 1518–1602), English noblewoman and painting subject of Hans Holbein the Younger
- Jason Small (politician) (born 1978), American politician
- Jason Small (racing driver) (born 1979), American racing driver
- Javon Small (born 2002), American basketball player
- Jay Newton-Small (born 1975), American journalist and writer
- Jeff Small (born 1973), American film studio executive
- Jessie Small (born 1966), American football player
- Joe Small (cricketer) (1892–1958), Trinidadian cricketer
- Joe Small (entertainer) (born 1830), New Zealand entertainer and songwriter
- John Small, multiple people
- Judy Small, Australian musician
- Kabza de Small (born 1992), real name Kabza Motha, South African DJ and producer
- Kate Small, American writer
- Keely Small (born 2001), Australian runner
- Kent Small (born 1984), Australian radio presenter
- Kiero Small (born 1989), American football player and coach
- Kim Small (born 1965), Australian field hockey player
- Lass Small (1923–2011), American author
- Lawrence M. Small (born 1941), American businessman and academic
- Len Small (1862–1936), American politician
- Len Small (footballer) (1920–2009), English footballer
- Leon G. Small (1903–1979), Canadian politician
- Leonard Small (1905–1994), Scottish Christian minister, military chaplain, author and footballer
- Leroy Small (born 1970), known as DJ SS, British DJ and record producer
- Leslie Small (born 1968/69), American film director and producer
- Lewis Small (born 1995), Scottish footballer
- Lisa Small, American art historian and museum curator
- Lothian Small (1884–1979), British labour activist and politician
- Louise Small (born 1992), British runner
- Margaret Small, American political scientist and activist
- Marian Small (born 1948), Canadian education researcher, writer, academic and public speaker
- Mario Luis Small, Panamanian sociologist and academic
- Mark Small (1967–2013), American baseball player
- Marty Small Sr. (born 1974), American politician
- Mary Small (1922–2007), American singer, actress and radio personality
- Mary Elizabeth Small (c. 1812–1908), English-New Zealand farmer
- Mary E. Small (born 1954), American politician
- Mary J. Small (1850–1945), American Christian minister and first female elder of the AME Zion Church
- Meghan Small (born 1998), American swimmer
- Melvin Small (born 1939), American historian and academic
- Meredith Small (born 1950), American anthropologist and academic
- Mews Small (born 1942), American actress
- Michael Small (1939–2003), American film score composer
- Mike Small (footballer) (born 1962), English footballer
- Mike Small (golfer) (born 1966), American golfer and coach
- Millie Small (1947–2020), Jamaican singer
- Milton Small (born 1964), Barbadian cricketer
- Nathan Small, American politician
- Neil Small, British health researcher and academic
- Nellie Small (1900–1968), Australian entertainer, singer and comedian
- Neptune Small (1831–1907), American slave
- Neva Small (born 1952), American actress and singer
- Nikayla Small (born 2003), Canadian soccer player
- O. J. Small (born 1982), American football player
- Oriana Small, known as Ashley Blue, American pornographic actress
- Paddy Small, Irish Gaelic footballer
- Pauline Small (1924–2005), American Crow politician
- Peter Small (born 1939), English rugby league footballer
- Peter Small (cricketer) (1925–2003), New Zealand cricketer
- Phil Small (born 1954), Australian musician
- Phil Small (journalist), Australian journalist
- Philip Albright Small Franklin (1871–1939), American businessman and survivor of the Titanic disaster
- Pippa Small, Canadian-British jeweller and humanitarian
- Rachael Small (born 1991), married name Rachael Boyle, Scottish footballer
- Rena Small (born 1954), American artist and photographer
- Richard Small, multiple people
- Robert Small, multiple people
- Rose Cook Small
- Roy Curtis Small (1932–2012), American politician
- S. Frederick Small (born 1965), known as Daddy Freddy, Jamaican singer
- Sami Jo Small (born 1976), Canadian ice hockey player
- Sarah Small (born 1979), American artist, musician, photographer and filmmaker
- Scott A. Small, American neuroscientist and neurologist
- Seth Small (born 1999), American football player
- Sharon Small (born 1967), Scottish actress
- Shayna Small, American actor and musician
- Sherrod Small (born 1973), American comedian
- Stephen B. Small (1947–1987), American businessman and murder victim
- Sterling Small, American politician
- Steve Small (born 1955), Australian cricketer
- Steven L. Small, American neuroscientist and administrator
- Susan Small (canoeist), British canoeist
- Taylor Small (born 1994), American politician
- Thierry Small (born 2004), English footballer
- Tony Small (diplomat) (1930–2015), New Zealand diplomat
- Torrance Small (born 1970), American football player
- Vernon Small (born 1954), New Zealand journalist and chess master
- Veronica Small-Eastman, American politician
- Viro Small (born 1854), American wrestler and boxer
- Vivian Blanche Small (1875–1946), American educator and administrator
- W. S. Small (1870–1943), American experimental psychologist
- Wade Small (born 1984), English footballer
- Wayne Small (born 1945), Canadian ice hockey player
- William Small (disambiguation), multiple people
  - William Small (1734–1775), Scottish physician and academic
- Wilson Small (1810–1886), American politician, businessman and civil servant
- Xochitl Torres Small (born 1984), American politician and lawyer

Fictional characters

- Diogenes Small, from the Inspector Morse series of books
- Leon Small, from the BBC soap opera EastEnders

== See also ==
- Small (disambiguation)
