= Smal =

Smal may refer to:

== People ==
- Cees Smal (1927-2001), Dutch musician
- Georges Smal (1928–1988), Belgian writer
- Gert Smal (born 1961), South African rugby player
- Gijs Smal (born 1997), Dutch football player
- Kirill Smal, Russian racing driver
- Louis Smal (born 1939), Belgian politician; a member of the Walloon Parliament from 2004 to 2009
- Nataliya Smal (born 1983), Ukrainian judoka and sambist
- Nic Smal, South African animator, writer, musician, and voice actor
- Roman Smal-Stocki (1893–1969), Ukrainian diplomat
- Sergey Smal (born 1968), Belarusian wrestler
- Stepan Smal-Stotsky, Ukrainian linguist and academician
- Victor Smal, Ukrainian politician

== Places ==
- Smal, Netherlands

== Other ==
- Smal, or Samael, an archangel

== See also ==
- Small (disambiguation)
