= Hubert Haas =

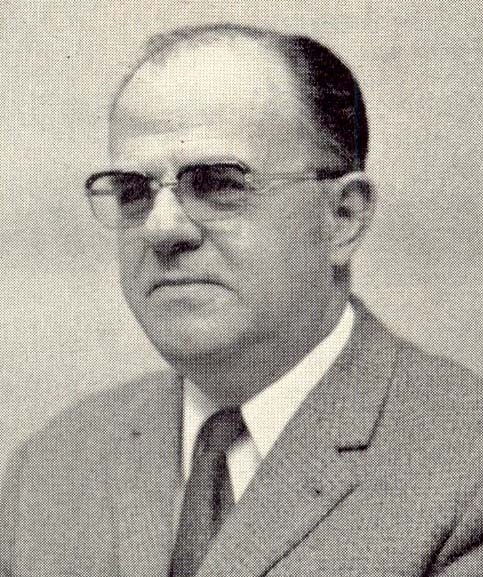
- Born: 23 August 1919; Châtelet, Belgium
- Died: 1976 (aged 56–57)
- Occupation: writer

Hubert Haas (23 August 1919 – 1976) was a Belgian writer known for his work in the Walloon language. He was born in Châtelet. Haas worked with Georges Smal and Jean Guillaume.
