= Small =

Small means of insignificant size.

Small may also refer to:

== Science and technology ==
- SMALL, an ALGOL-like programming language
- Small (journal), a nano-science publication
- <small>, an HTML element that defines smaller text

== Arts and entertainment ==
=== Fictional characters ===
- Small, in the British children's show Big & Small

== Other uses ==
- Small (surname)
- List of people known as the Small
- "Small", a song from the album The Cosmos Rocks by Queen + Paul Rodgers

== See also ==
- Smal (disambiguation)
- Smalls (disambiguation)
