= Mary Small (disambiguation) =

Mary Small (1922–2007) was an American singer, actress, and radio personality. Mary Small may also refer to:

- Mary E. Small (born 1954), American politician
- Mary Elizabeth Small (c. 1812–1908), New Zealand market gardener and farmer
- Mary J. Small (1850–1945), American reverend of the African Methodist Episcopal Zion Church
