= Smol =

Smol is a surname. Notable people with the surname include:

- Frits Smol (1924–2006), Dutch water polo player.
- John Smol (born 1955), Canadian ecologist, limnologist, and paleolimnologist.

== See also ==
- Small (surname)
