= Joe Small =

Joe Small may refer to:

- Joe Small (entertainer) (1830–?), New Zealand entertainer
- Joe Small (cricketer) (1892–1958), West Indian cricketer
