= 1849 United States Senate elections in California =

- December 20, 1849

24 votes needed to win
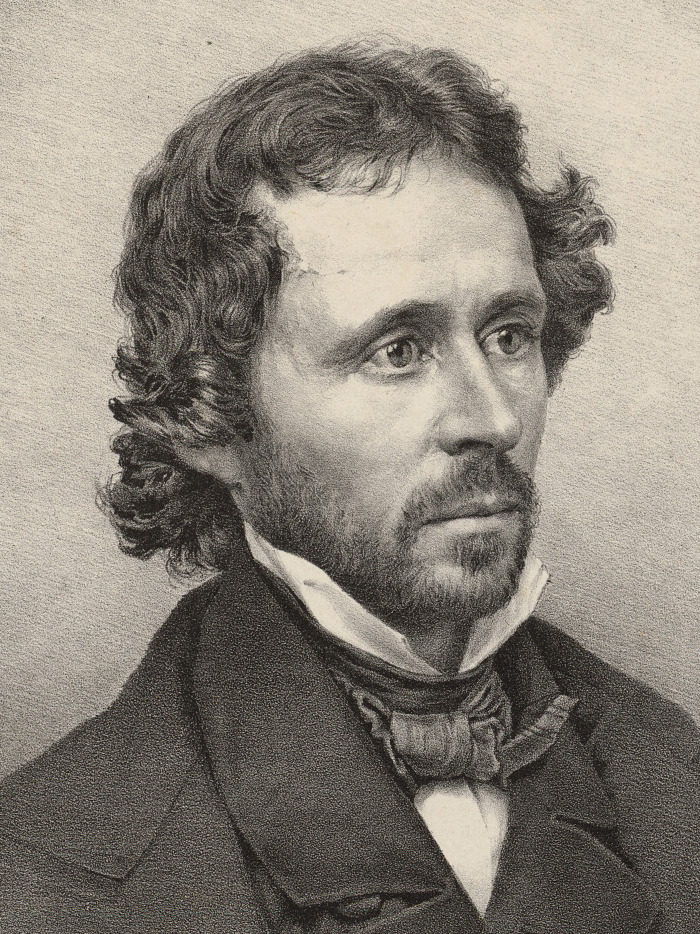

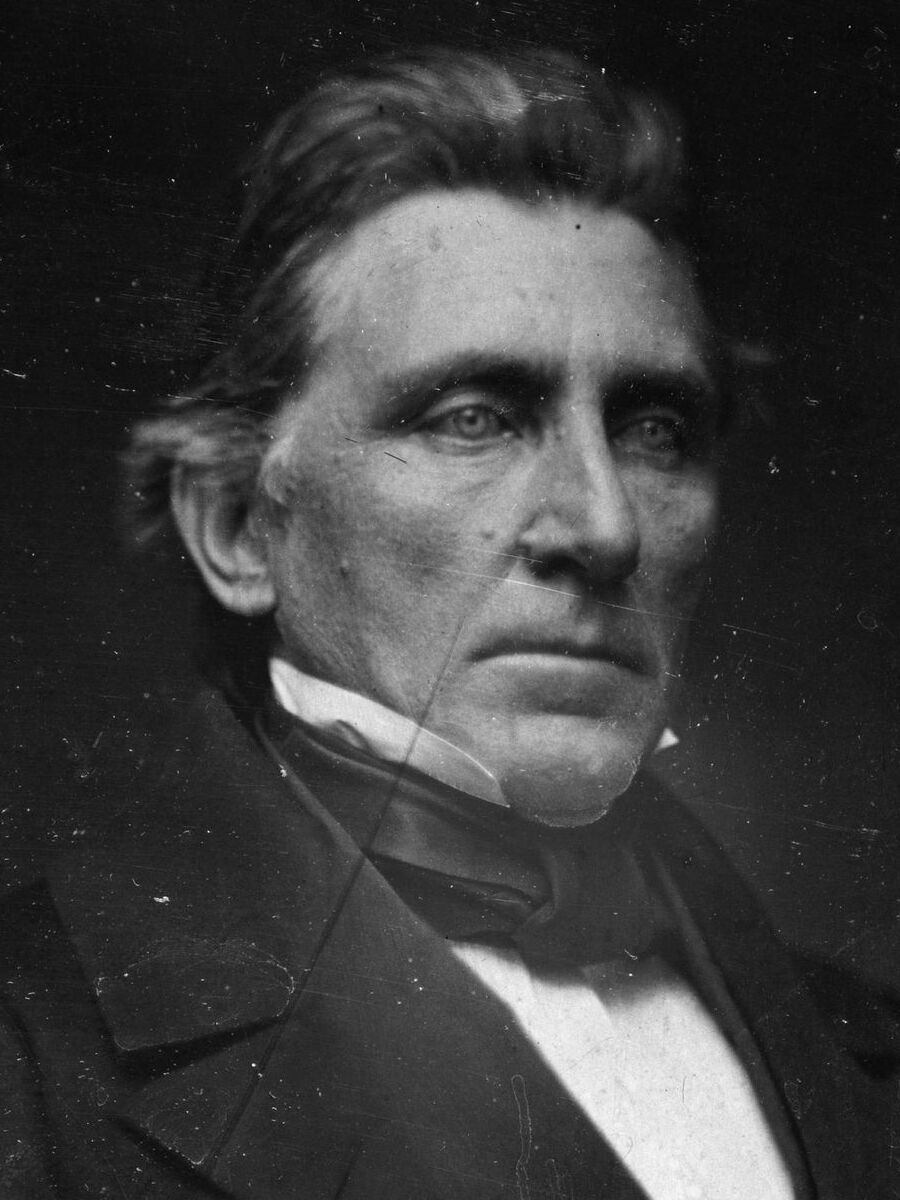

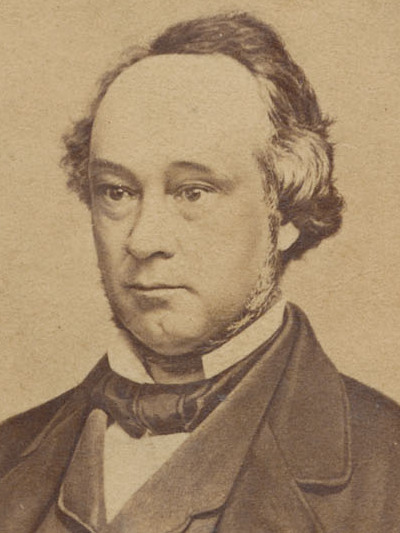

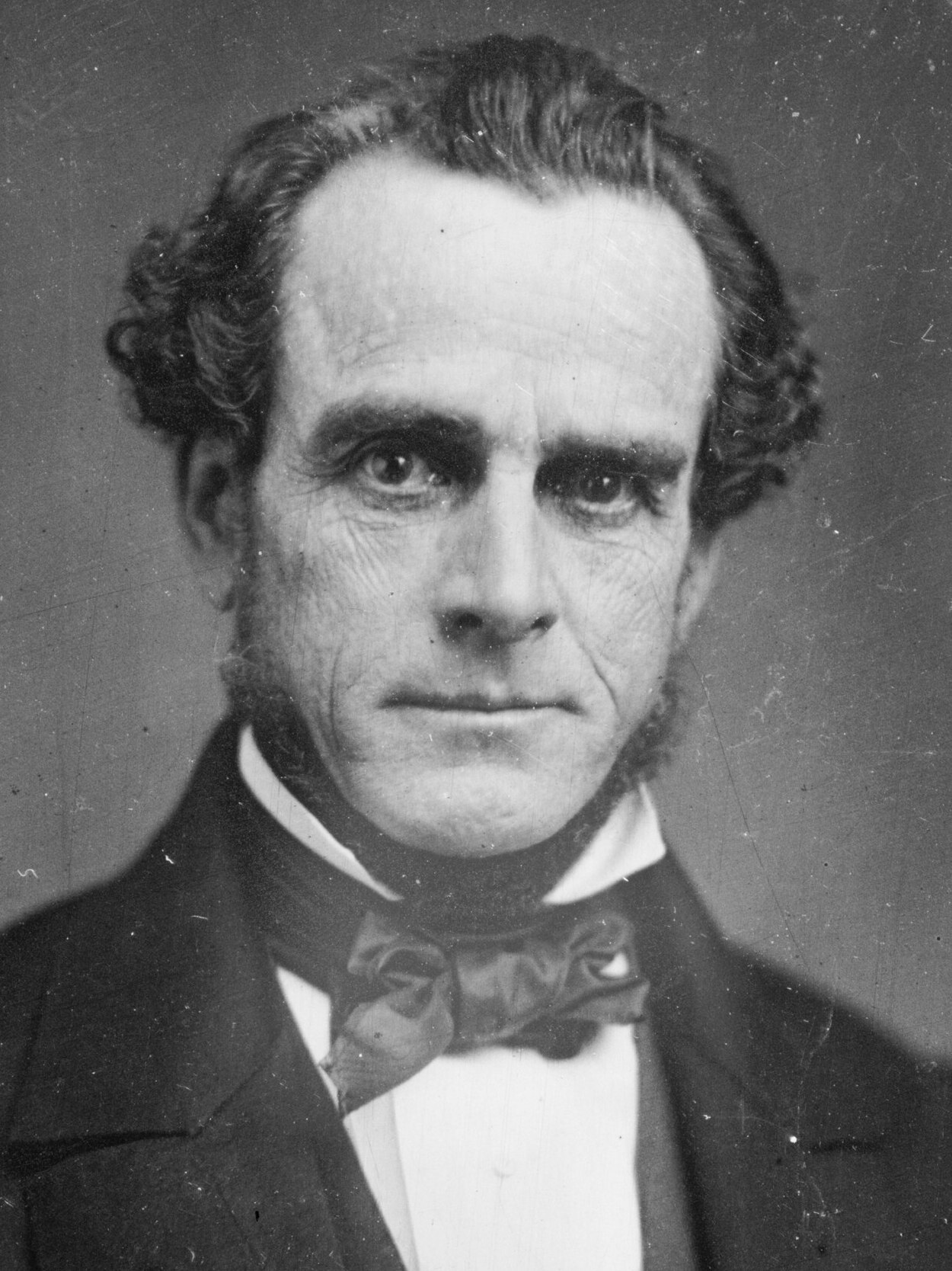

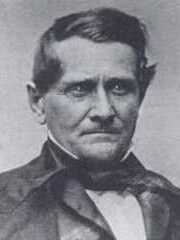

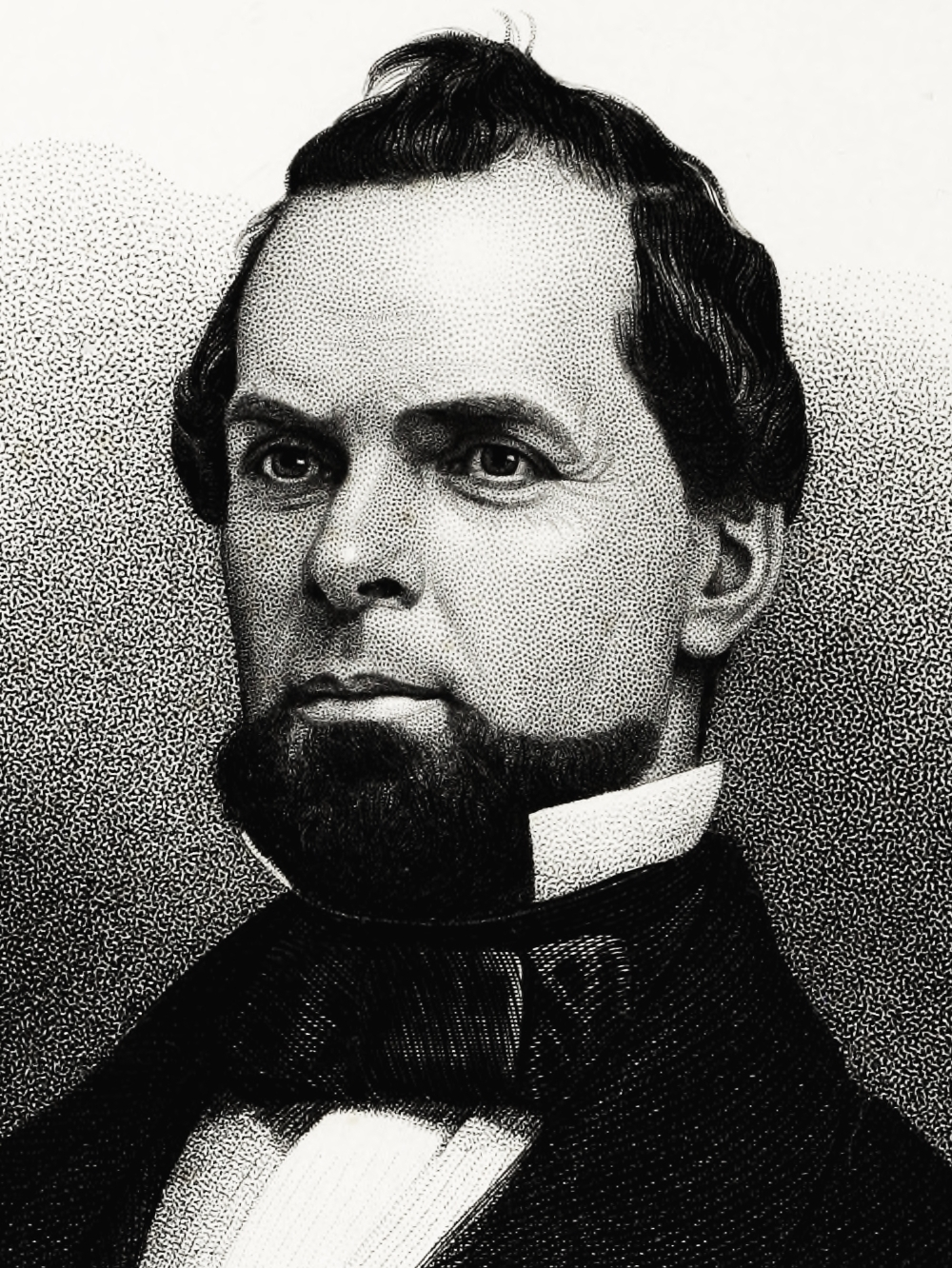
| Nominee | John C. Frémont | William M. Gwin | Henry Halleck |
| Party | Democratic | Democratic | Democratic |
| First ballot | 29 | 22 | 14 |
| Percentage | 31.52% | 23.91% | 15.22% |
| Third ballot | | 24 | 18 |
| Percentage | | 51.06% | 38.30% |
| Nominee | Thomas Butler King | Thomas J. Henley | John W. Geary |
| Party | Whig | Democratic | Democratic |
| First ballot | 10 | 9 | 5 |
| Percentage | 10.87% | 9.78% | 5.43% |
| Third ballot | 1 | 3 | 1 |
| Percentage | 2.13% | 6.38% | 2.13% |
Elected Senator
John C. Frémont (Class I)
William M. Gwin (Class III)
Democratic

The 1849 United States Senate elections in California were held on December 20, 1849, by the California State Legislature to elect two U.S. Senators (Class 1 and Class 3) to represent the State of California in the United States Senate. Democrats John C. Frémont and William M. Gwin were elected over several other challengers.

== Results ==
Election in the Legislature (first ballot)
| Party | Candidate | Votes | % |
|---|---|---|---|
| Democratic | John C. Frémont | 29 | 31.52% |
| Democratic | William M. Gwin | 22 | 23.91% |
| Democratic | Henry Halleck | 14 | 15.22% |
| Whig | Thomas Butler King | 10 | 10.87% |
| Democratic | Thomas J. Henley | 9 | 9.78% |
| Democratic | John W. Geary | 5 | 5.43% |
| Independent | Robert B. Semple | 3 | 3.26% |
| Total votes | | 92 | 100.00% |

Election in the Legislature (third ballot)
| Party | Candidate | Votes | % |
|---|---|---|---|
| Democratic | William M. Gwin | 24 | 51.06% |
| Democratic | Henry Halleck | 18 | 38.30% |
| Democratic | Thomas J. Henley | 3 | 6.38% |
| Whig | Thomas Butler King | 1 | 2.13% |
| Democratic | John W. Geary | 1 | 2.13% |
| Total votes | | 47 | 100.00% |
