= Biblio-Mat =

Random book vending machine in Toronto

The Biblio-Mat is a random antiquarian book vending machine located at The Monkey's Paw bookstore in Toronto, Canada designed by visual artist Craig Small.

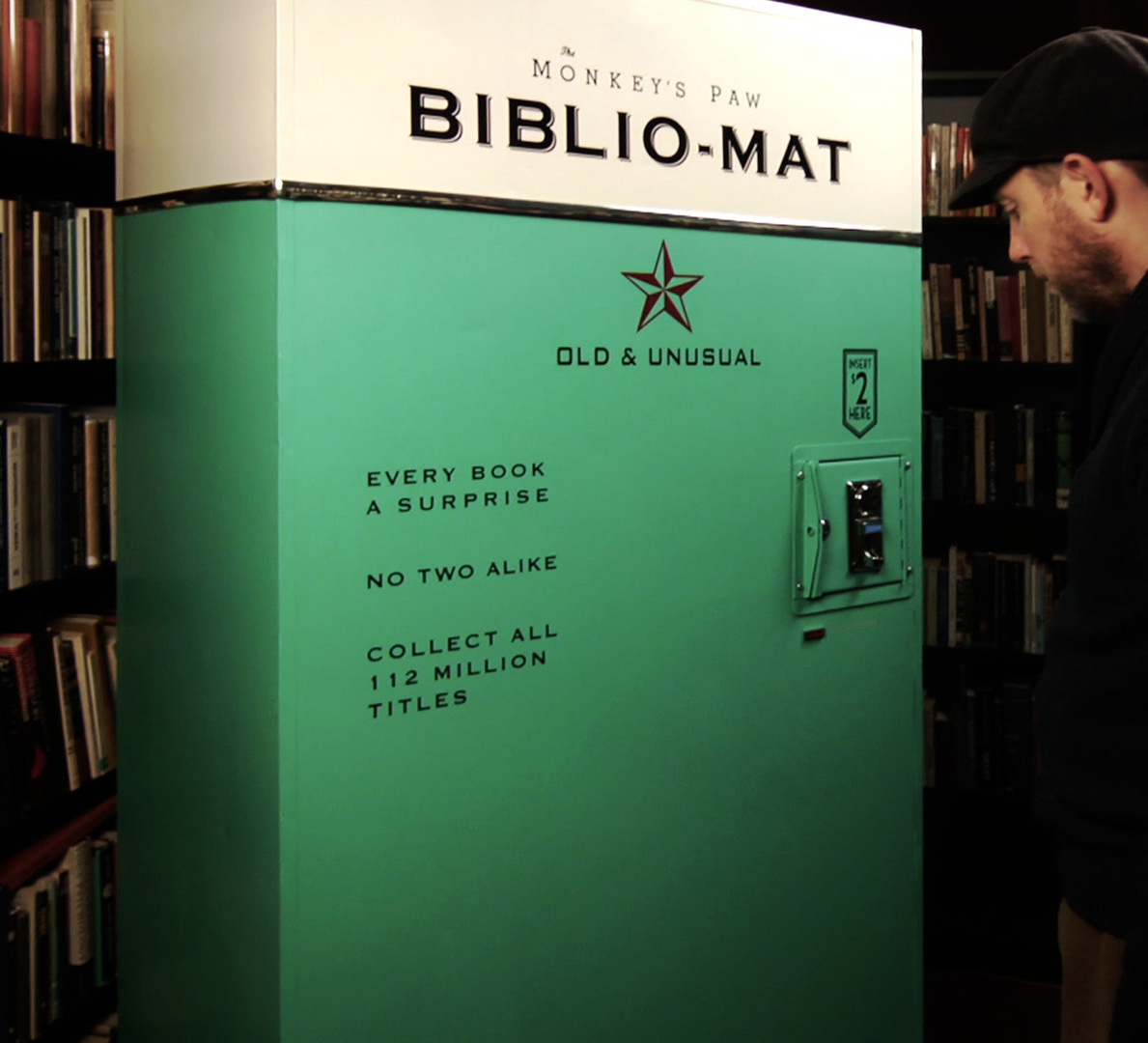
The Biblio-Mat in 2012.

== History ==
=== Origin ===
Stephen Fowler, owner of The Monkey's Paw, and his friend Craig Small conceived of the Biblio-Mat in 2012. Fowler, looking for ways to attract customers to his shop’s booth at an upcoming street fair, shared with Small his idea of painting a large cardboard box to look like a vending machine, inside of which an assistant would drop an old random book out of a slot in exchange for a coin. Small loved the idea, but proposed creating a real mechanized vending machine instead. The Biblio-Mat was installed at The Monkey’s Paw in November of 2012. The original price to vend a book was CDN$2. In 2022, the price was increased to $5.

=== Design ===
The Biblio-Mat was inspired by vending machines from the 1940s and 50s and was designed to complement the existing aesthetic of The Monkey's Paw bookshop. The machine's shell, made from a salvaged steel office storage locker, is painted pistachio-green at its base and ivory white on top. It features chrome accents and vintage lettering.

=== Random delivery system ===
The insertion of a coin or token prompts the Biblio-Mat's microprocessor to randomly select a book from one of three vertical stacks and triggers an antique telephone bell that rings upon delivery. The Biblio-Mat has been referred to as a “serendipity machine." Small said, in an interview with CTV News: "You don't choose the book, the universe chooses it for you."

== Reception ==
Upon its launch, The Biblio-Mat attracted attention from international media outlets as well as thousands of blogs and specialty publications.

Authors Margaret Atwood, William Gibson, and Neil Gaiman are admirers of the Biblio-Mat.

== Influence ==
The Biblio-Mat consistently appears on lists of top Toronto attractions and is often cited as a reason people visit the city. “People use the machine every day, people come visit us from all over the place,” Fowler told Global News in 2018. “Sometimes it feels like the thing is just running non-stop all day long.” The website Atlas Obscura has listed the Biblio-Mat as number one among “Cool, Hidden, and Unusual Things to Do in Toronto.”

In 2021, the musician Jack White, a Biblio-Mat fan, commissioned Small to build a random book machine for the third location of his Third Man Records store in the Soho district of London. The machine, called The Literarium, dispenses random literature from White's publishing company, Third Man Books.

The Biblio-Mat is cited in books about the book trade, including Bibliophile: An Illustrated Miscellany (2018) and The Bookseller's Tale (2020).

== Notable uses ==
People have used the machine to propose marriage on at least two occasions.

In 2013, a Monkey's Paw customer named Vincent Lui used the Biblio-Mat once a week for a year and wrote a review of every book it dispensed. Lui's project was celebrated during Biblio-Mat Fanatic Day.

In 2018, the Biblio-Mat was featured on an episode of The Amazing Race Canada.
