= Rae Peppers =

American politician

Member of the Montana House of Representatives from the 41st district
- In office January 7, 2013 – January 4, 2021
- Preceded by: Sterling Small
- Succeeded by: Rynalea Whiteman Pena

Personal details
- Party: Democratic

Patricia Rae Peppers is an American politician who served as a member of the Montana House of Representatives from 2013 to 2021. When elected in 2012, Peppers defeated Republican incumbent Sterling Small by a margin of 1,399 to 1,080.

== Early life and education ==
Peppers attended Wyola School on the Crow Indian Reservation in Montana. When she was 8 years old, her father took her to live in New Mexico for eight years against her mother's will. At the age of 16, she hitchhiked back to Montana and was reunited with her mother and sisters.

She earned a B.S. in Business Administration and Information Systems and an M.S. in Communications and Information Processing.

== Montana State Legislature ==
=== Elections ===
In 2012, Rae Peppers decided to run for Montana's 41st House District in the Montana House of Representatives. The district includes Rosebud and Big Horn counties, and both the Crow and Northern Cheyenne reservations. She was unopposed in the June Democratic primary, and in the general election she defeated incumbent Sterling Small 56%-44%. She ran unopposed in 2014 and was re-elected. In 2020, she ran for Montana State Senate District 21, but lost in the general 42%-58% to Jason Small, a Republican. In 2024, she ran again for Montana State Senate District 21, but lost in the primary to Sharon Stewart-Peregoy.

=== Committee assignments ===
- House Federal Relations, Energy, and Telecommunications Committee (2013)
- House Agriculture Committee (2013)
- House Business and Labor Committee (2013)
- House Appropriations Committee (2015, 2017, 2019)
- House Joint Appropriations Subcommittee on Long-Range Planning (2015, 2017, 2019)

=== Tenure ===
In 2012, Peppers' son, Joshua Peppers, lost his right foot following an attack involving an IED while on duty with the U.S. Army in Afghanistan. Subsequently, in 2013 she sponsored legislation (House Bill 447) to provide scholarships for Montana Purple Heart recipients.

In 2019, Peppers put forward House Bill 21 ("Hanna's Act") which created a new specialist position in the Department of Justice to help investigate all missing persons cases. This bill, which passed April 21, 2019, was one of three bills created by the State-Tribal Relations Committee to address the Missing and Murdered Indigenous Women crisis.

== Later career ==
After leaving the Montana State Legislature, Peppers joined the Northern Cheyenne Development Corporation, where she serves as the finance manager. She is a board member for the Pretty Eagle Woman Foundation, an organization advocating for justice for missing and murdered indigenous persons.

== Personal life ==
She is a member of the Crow Tribe and resides in Lame Deer, Montana.

== See also ==
- List of Native American politicians
- Native American women in politics

Montana House of Representatives
Preceded by Sterling Small	Member of the Montana House of Representatives from the 41st district 2013–2021	Succeeded by Rynalea Whiteman Pena
