= Yuriy Bolokhovets =

- Юрій Віталійович Болоховець
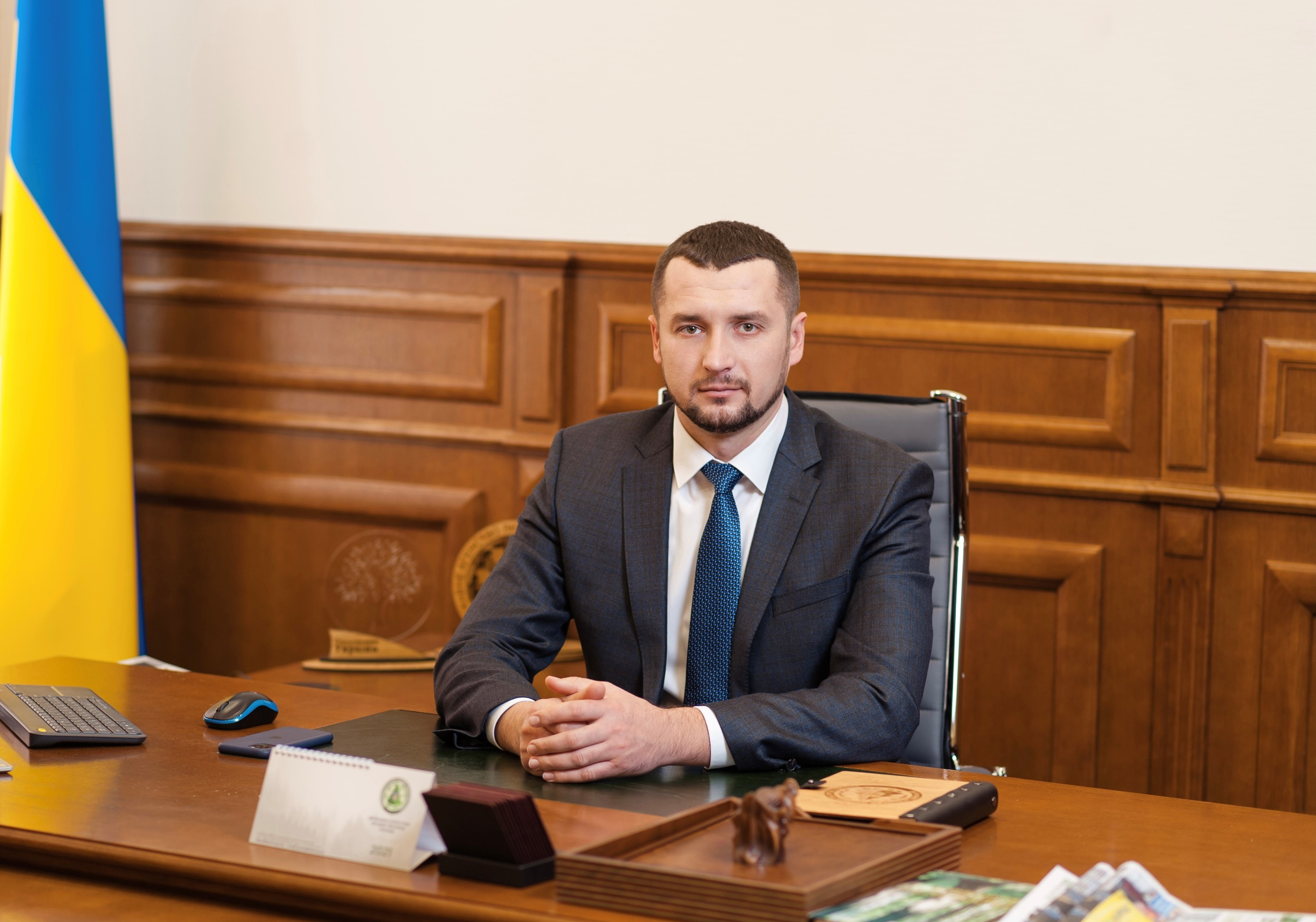

Chairman of the State Agency of Forest Resources of Ukraine
- In office 18 February 2021 – 2 May 2023
- Preceded by: Vasyl Kuzyovych
- Succeeded by: Victor Smal

Personal details
- Born: December 18, 1982 (age 43) Ivanhorod, Ichnia Raion, Chernihiv Oblast, Ukrainian SSR (now Ukraine)
- Citizenship: Ukraine
- Party: Agrarian Party of Ukraine
- Spouse: Liudmyla Volodymyrivna Bolokhovets
- Education: National University of Life and Environmental Sciences of Ukraine
- Occupation: Forestry official

Yuriy Vitaliyovych Bolokhovets (born 18 December 1982) is a Ukrainian forestry official who served as Chairman of the State Agency of Forest Resources of Ukraine. He currently serves as General Director of the state enterprise "Forests of Ukraine" (Ukrainian: Ліси України).

== Biography ==
Bolokhovets was born on 18 December 1982 in the village of Ivanhorod, Ichnia Raion, Chernihiv Oblast.

=== Education ===
In 2005, Bolokhovets graduated from the Faculty of Forestry of the National Agrarian University with a degree in forestry, qualifying as a forestry engineer.

In 2003, he completed an agricultural work placement in Shropshire, United Kingdom.

=== Career ===
From November 2004 to January 2007, he worked as a leading specialist–state inspector in the forest protection, use and reproduction control sector of the State Directorate of Ecology and Natural Resources in Kyiv Oblast of the Ministry of Ecology and Natural Resources of Ukraine.

For the following eight months he was a leading specialist–state inspector in the department for protection, use, reproduction of forests, wildlife and nature reserve areas of the same directorate.

From July 2007 to May 2011, he worked as a forestry engineer and forester at the "Ichniarayahrolisnytstvo" subsidiary enterprise of the "Chernihivoblahroles" municipal enterprise.

From May 2011 to June 2012, he served as director of the state enterprise "Pryluky Forestry" under the Chernihiv Regional Directorate of Forestry and Hunting. He later served as director of the state enterprise "Nizhyn Forestry" under the same directorate (June 2012 – June 2020).

From June to July 2020, he headed the Chernihiv Regional Directorate of Forestry and Hunting.

From July 2020 to February 2021, he served as Deputy Chairman of the State Agency of Forest Resources of Ukraine.

On 18 February 2021, he was appointed Chairman of the State Agency of Forest Resources of Ukraine.

He was reappointed to the same position on 3 November 2021.

On 2 May 2023, he was dismissed from the position of Chairman of the State Agency of Forest Resources of Ukraine.

=== Leadership of SE "Forests of Ukraine" ===
In May 2023, Bolokhovets was appointed General Director of the state specialized economic enterprise "Forests of Ukraine," created as part of the reform of Ukraine's state forestry sector.

Under his leadership, the merger of state forestry enterprises into a single vertically integrated management system was completed, a centralized corporate governance model and unified operating standards were introduced, and centralized procurement and timber sales through exchange mechanisms were established.

Following the reform, the enterprise reported record financial results; by the end of 2025, SE "Forests of Ukraine" achieved the industry's highest-ever revenue, profit and tax contributions to the state budget.

Preparations also began for the corporatization of the enterprise, its transition to International Financial Reporting Standards (IFRS), the formation of a supervisory board, and the implementation of a corporate ERP system for business-process management.

During his tenure, the Carpathian region also began transitioning to a close-to-nature forestry model, a program to transfer self-seeded forests to permanent state enterprise use started, forestry infrastructure and fire-protection systems were modernized, and the enterprise's support for the Armed Forces of Ukraine was expanded.

== Political activity ==
Bolokhovets is a member of the Agrarian Party of Ukraine. He has run for office twice on the party's ticket:

- in the 2015 election to the Chernihiv Regional Council (7th convocation);
- in the 2019 snap election to the Verkhovna Rada (9th convocation).

== Personal life ==
Bolokhovets is married to Liudmyla Volodymyrivna Bolokhovets.
