= The Monkey's Paw (bookstore) =

Bookstore in Toronto, Canada

Coordinates: 43.6603°N 79.4327°W

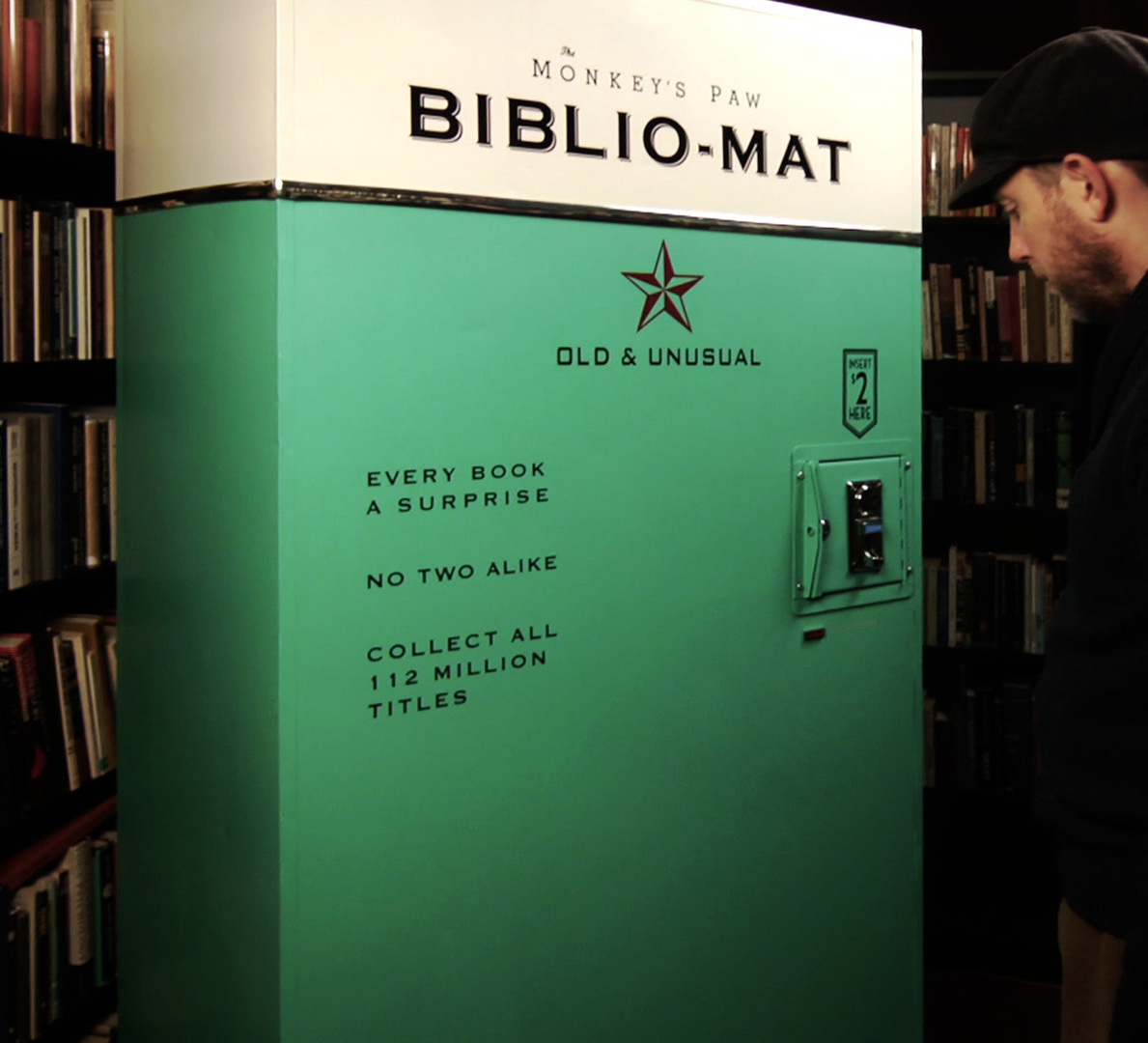
The Monkey's Paw Biblio-Mat

The Monkey's Paw is an independent used-book store in Toronto, Ontario, Canada known for its eclectic, arcane, and absurd books, and for the Biblio-Mat, a random book vending machine.

Owner Stephen Fowler founded The Monkey's Paw in 2006, four years after he moved to Toronto from San Francisco, where he worked in numerous bookstores. Fowler opened The Monkey's Paw in order to support his family with another income source. The inspiration and book selection methods of the store is based on his work in a previous San Francisco bookstore that placed books that were too unique, specific, or unusual for a single-subject category under a miscellaneous section "Floop". Many, including the owner, consider the store itself a showcase and homage to the printed book, which they believe to be dying medium. Due to the notoriety and uniqueness of the bookstore, Fowler was invited to join the International League of Antiquarian Booksellers.

The New York Times Style Magazine quoted the owner, "It's the store where you'll find the book you didn't know you were looking for."
