= William Bethune Lindsay =

- Born: 3 November 1880; Strathroy, Ontario
- Died: 27 June 1933 (aged 52); Toronto, Ontario
- Military career
- Allegiance: Canada
- Branch: Canadian Corps
- Rank: Major General
- Commands: Chief Engineer of the Canadian Corps
- Conflicts: World War I
- Awards: Order of St Michael and St George; Order of the Bath

Major General William Bethune Lindsay CB CMG DSO (3 November 1880 – 27 June 1933) was a Canadian military officer during World War I.

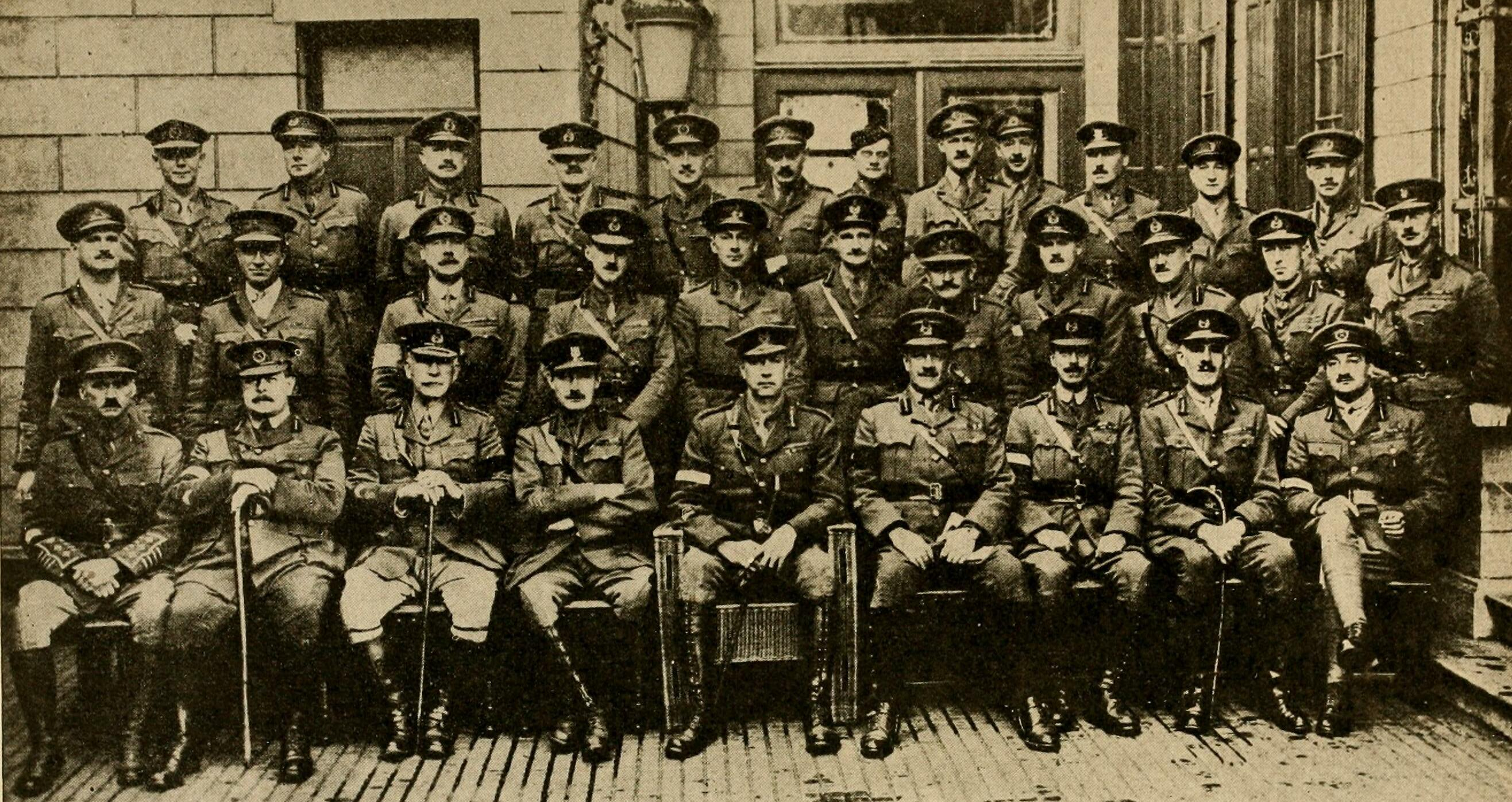
Lieutenant General Sir Arthur Currie with H. R. H. Prince Arthur of Connaught and other senior officers. Major General W. B. Lindsay is sat in the front row, second on the left.

Lindsay was born on 3 November 1880, the son of Dr. W. B. Lindsay, of Strathroy, Ontario, Canada. Lindsay was educated at Strathroy District Collegiate Institute (along with Arthur William Currie) and later enrolled at the Royal Military College of Canada. In 1900, he was appointed assistant engineer of the Department of Marine and Fisheries. Lindsay was one of the original officers of the Corps of Royal Canadian Engineers. During the First World War, he served as Chief Engineer of the Canadian Corps and was responsible for a major reorganization of the engineering component of the corps that proved particularly helpful in the Hundred Days Offensive near the end of the War.

Following the war Lindsay went to Alberta and became an early advocate of the commercial and industrial development of the tar sands. With government support his company sent tons of material to an Anglo-Persian Oil Company facility in Swansea, Wales for testing. In 1925, with what appeared to be limited prospects for success, he dissolved the company. He died of a heart attack at Toronto Hunt Club on 27 June 1933 and is buried at Strathroy Municipal Cemetery.
