= Brunswick–Altamaha Canal =

Canal in Georgia, United States

Coordinates: 31°16′26.2″N 81°28′38.4″W

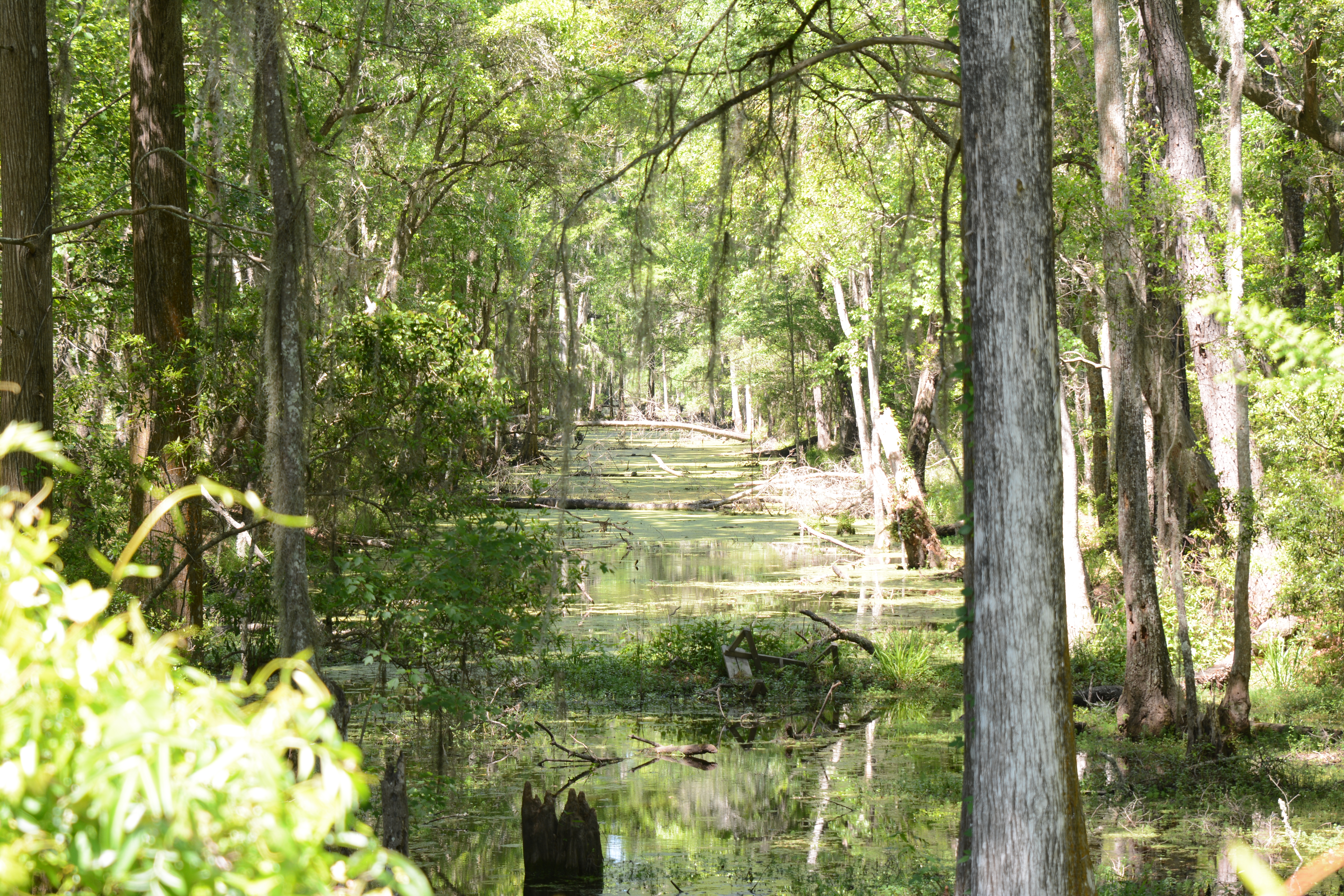
The canal in 2016

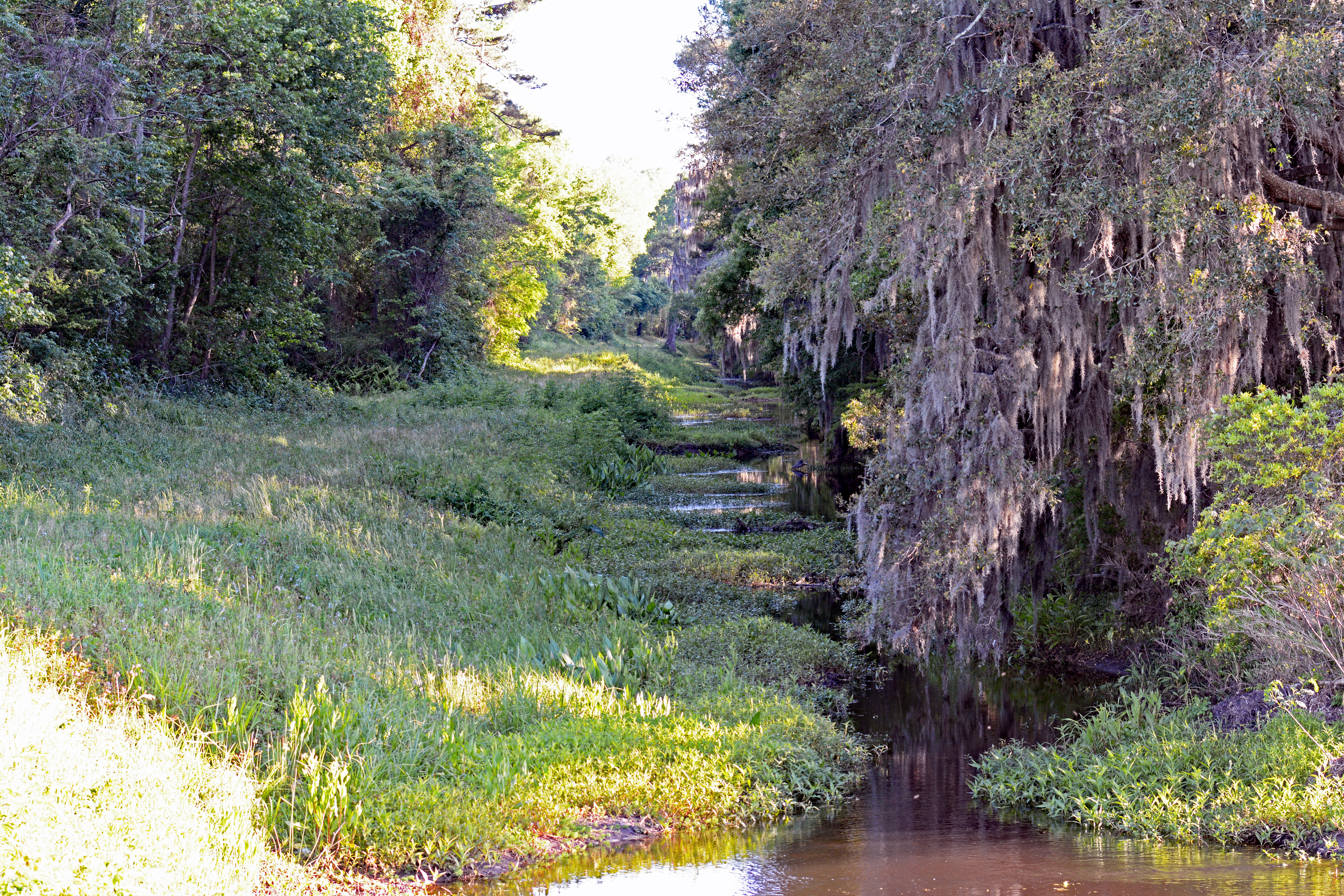
The canal in 2016

The Brunswick–Altamaha Canal was a 12-mile-long canal built to connect the Altamaha River to the city of Brunswick, Georgia at the Turtle River to transport goods from Brunswick's port to areas farther north and inland. It included locks on both ends of the canal. The canal was originally proposed in 1798 and after two failed charters (1826 and 1830), construction was started in 1836 by Thomas Butler King. The project was estimated to cost $450,000. The canal was finished and opened in 1854; however, by that time the canal was obsolete because of new railroads. The canal was closed by 1860. The Columbian mammoth was discovered during the construction of the canal.
