= Smalls =

Smalls may refer to:

- Smalls (surname)
- Camp Robert Smalls, a United States Naval training facility
- Fort Robert Smalls, a Civil War redoubt
- Smalls Creek, a northern tributary of the Parramatta River
- Smalls Falls, a waterfall in Maine, USA
- Smalls Jazz Club, a jazz club located in New York City
- Smalls Paradise (1925–1986), a jazz club in Harlem, New York City
- Nickname for responsions, an examination formerly conducted at Oxford University
- The Smalls, a group rocks off the coast of and the location of the Smalls Lighthouse
- The Smalls (1990–2001), a punk rock band from Edmonton, Canada
- Tijuana Smalls, a brand of flavored cigarette
- An informal colloquial term for undergarments
- Smalls, a major supporting character in the upcoming video game Mindwave
