= Joseph W. Jackson =

American politician and lawyer (1796–1854)

Joseph Webber Jackson (December 6, 1796 – September 29, 1854) was an American politician and lawyer from the state of Georgia who served in the United States Congress.

== Early life ==
Jackson was born in Cedar Hill, Georgia, near Savannah. He studied law, gained admittance to the state bar and became a practicing attorney.

== Career ==
Jackson served on the Savannah municipal council and also as the city's Mayor. He served in the Georgia House of Representatives and then in the Georgia Senate. Jackson served as a captain in the Savannah Volunteer Guards and also as a colonel of the 1st Regiment in the Georgia Militia in addition to serving as judge of the superior court of Georgia.

Jackson was elected to the United States House of Representatives as a Democrat to fill remainder of the term for the seat left vacant in Georgia's 1st congressional district in the 31st United States Congress by the resignation of Thomas B. King in 1850. Jackson was reelected as a States Rights candidate to the 32nd Congress and served from March 4, 1850, through March 3, 1853. He did not run for reelection in 1852 to the 33rd Congress. Jackson died in Savannah on September 29, 1854.

U.S. House of Representatives
| Preceded by Thomas B. King | Member of the U.S. House of Representatives from Georgia's 1st congressional district March 4, 1850 – March 3, 1853 | Succeeded by James Lindsay Seward |
