= T. Butler King =

American politician (1800–1864)

Thomas Butler King
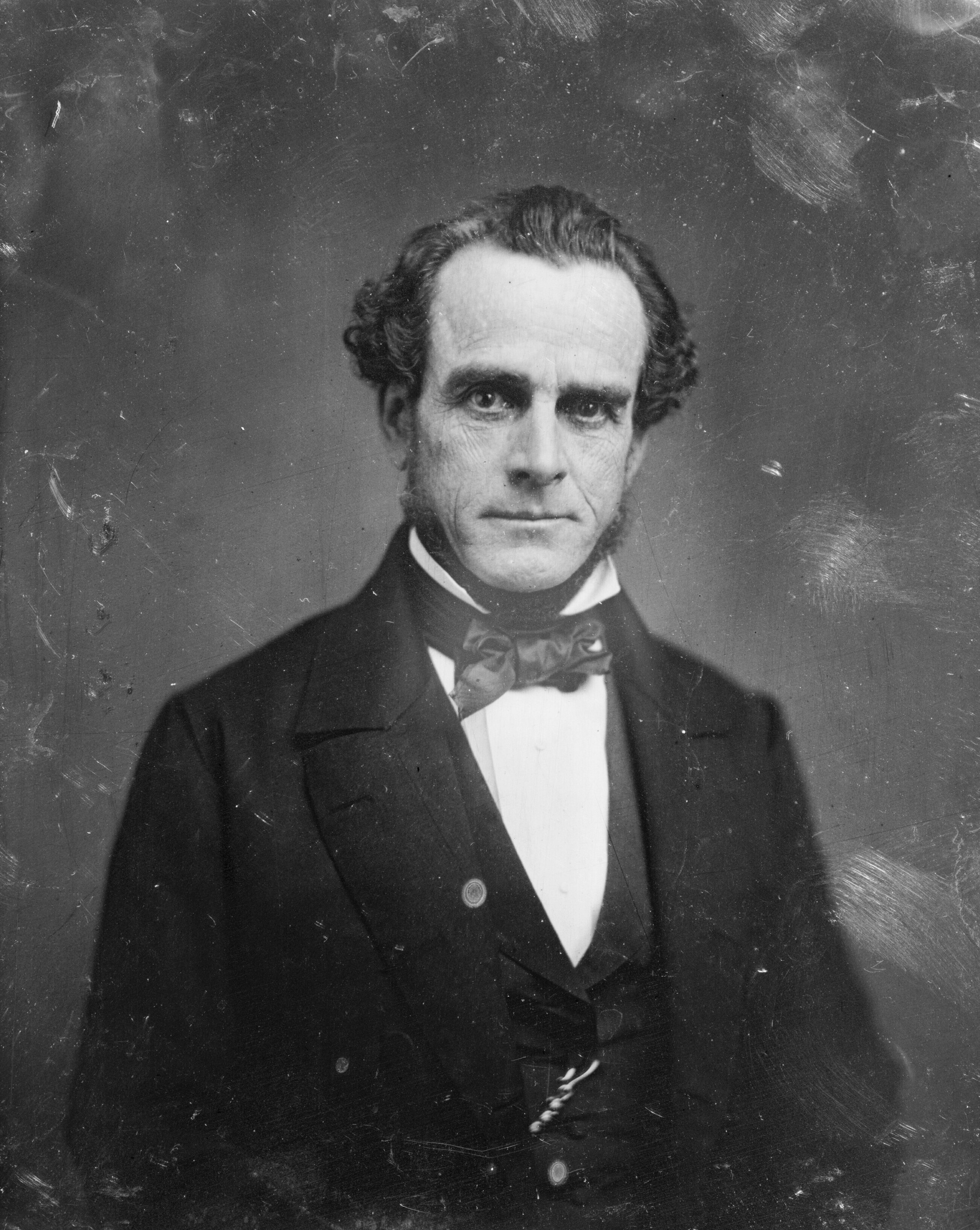

Member of the U.S. House of Representatives from Georgia's at-large & 1st district
- In office March 4, 1839 – March 3, 1843
- Preceded by: George W. Towns
- Succeeded by: John B. Lamar
- In office March 4, 1845 – March 3, 1850
- Preceded by: Alexander Stephens
- Succeeded by: Joseph W. Jackson

Member of the Georgia Senate
- In office 1832; 1834–1835; 1837

Personal details
- Born: August 27, 1800 Palmer, Massachusetts, United States
- Died: May 10, 1864 (aged 63) Waresboro, Georgia, Confederate States
- Resting place: Churchyard of Christ Church, Frederica, St. Simons, Georgia
- Party: Whig
- Spouse: Anna Matilda Page (c. 1800 – 1859)
- Children: John Floyd King

Thomas Butler King I (August 27, 1800 – May 10, 1864) was an American politician from the state of Georgia. Late in life, King spent ten years in the newly admitted state of California and twice attempted to become a senator from that state.

== Early life ==
He was born on August 27, 1800, in Palmer, Massachusetts, to Daniel King and Hannah Lord. He was of English descent, and among his first ancestors coming to America was John King, of Edwardstone, Suffolk, England, who, in 1715, was the first settler on a tract of land in what was then the Colony of Massachusetts. For a generation or more, that tract of land was known as Kingstown. Afterwards, it was called Palmer.

He attended Westfield State University and then studied law under his brother, Henry King in Allentown, Pennsylvania. He was admitted to the Pennsylvania State Bar in 1822.

== Georgia ==
In 1823 he traveled with his brother, Stephen Clay King, to practice law in Waynesville, Georgia.

In 1824, he married Anna Matilda Page (c. 1800 – 1859). They had ten children who survived to adulthood, including a son, John Floyd King. Thomas was elected to the Georgia Senate in 1832 to represent Glynn County, Georgia, and served in that position in 1834, 1835, and again in 1837. He was elected to the US House of Representatives in 1838 to the 26th Congress.

King would attempt to regain his old seat in the Confederate Congress in 1863 against Julian Hartridge. King narrowly lost, receiving 2,909 votes to Hartridge's 3,077 votes and a third candidate named C.H. Hopkins' 766. This likely occurred because of distrust of King by Savannah voters.

== California ==
King accepted an appointment in California as tax collector for the Port of San Francisco under President Millard Fillmore. He then went to work as a lobbyist for the Southern Pacific Railroad Company. King was a candidate for U.S. Senate in 1849, but was unsuccessful.

San Francisco's King Street, near the port and major rail yards, is named after him.

== Death ==
King died in Waresboro, Georgia on May 10, 1864. He was buried in the churchyard of Christ Church on St. Simons Island.

== See also ==
- United States House election, 1838
- Brunswick–Altamaha Canal
- Neptune Small

== Sources ==
- Edward M. Steel Jr. T. Butler King of Georgia (University of Georgia Press: 1964)

U.S. House of Representatives
Preceded by George W. Towns	Member of the U.S. House of Representatives from Georgia's at-large congressional district March 4, 1839 – March 3, 1843	Succeeded by John Basil Lamar
Preceded by Alexander H. Stephens	Member of the U.S. House of Representatives from Georgia's 1st congressional district March 4, 1845 – March 3, 1850	Succeeded by Joseph W. Jackson
