= Strathroy-Caradoc =

- Municipality (lower-tier)
- Municipality of Strathroy-Caradoc
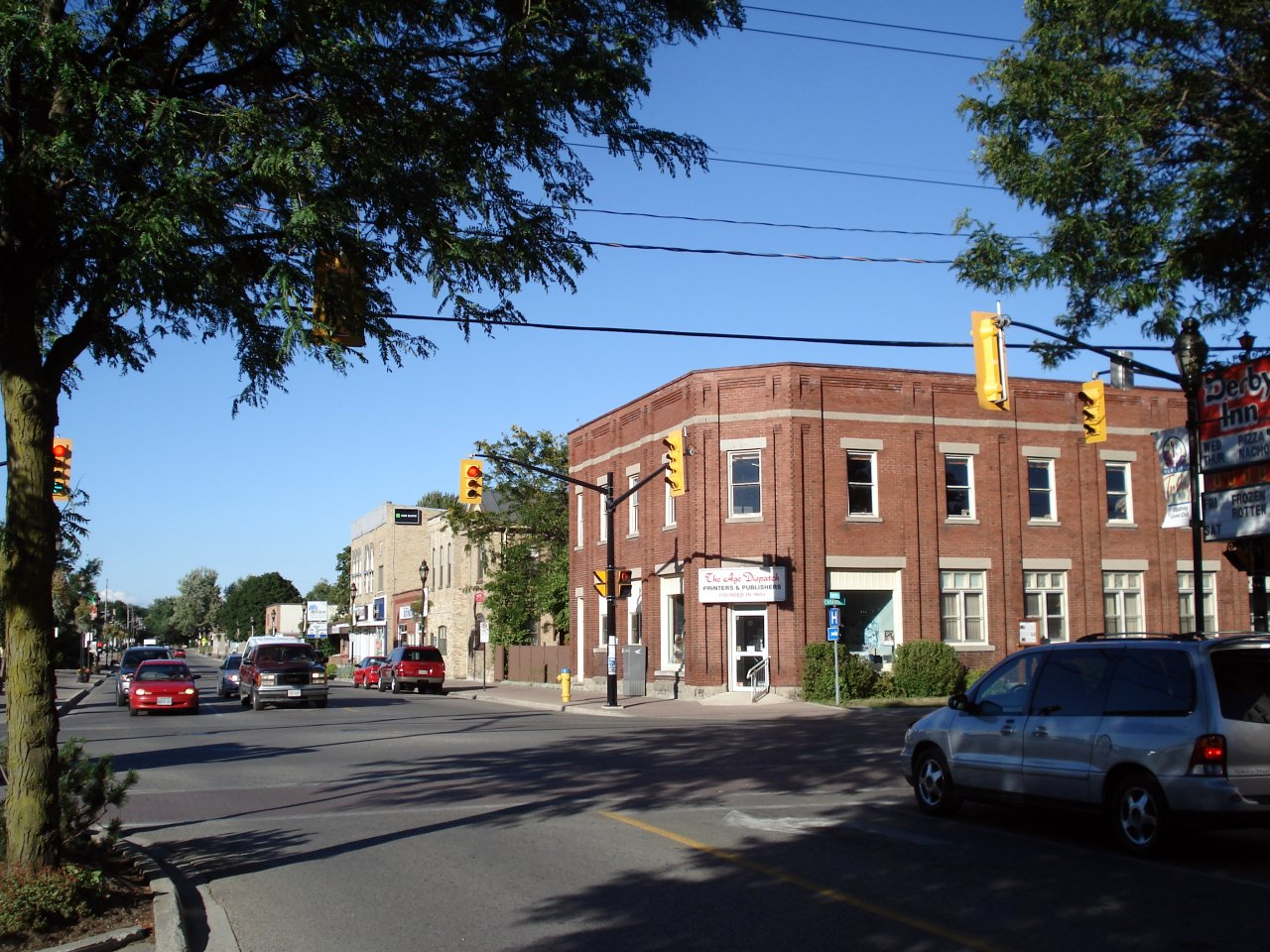
- Corner of Caradoc St. N and Front St. W in Strathroy
- Motto: "Urban Opportunity - Rural Hospitality"
- Location within Middlesex County Location within Southern Ontario
- Coordinates: 42°57′27″N 81°37′00″W
- Country: Canada
- Province: Ontario
- County: Middlesex
- Settled: 1832
- Incorporated: 1860 (as village); 1872 (as town)
- Amalgamated: January 1, 2001

Government
  - Mayor: Colin Grantham
  - Gov. Body: Strathroy Municipal Council
  - MP: Lianne Rood (C)
  - MPPs: Steve Pinsonneault (PC)

Area
  - Land: 270.86 km^{2} (104.58 sq mi)

Population (2021)
  - Municipality (lower-tier): 23,871
  - Density: 88.1/km^{2} (228/sq mi)
  - Urban: 16,056
- Time zone: UTC−5 (EST)
  - Summer (DST): UTC−4 (EDT)
- Forward sortation area: N7G
- Area codes: 519, 226, 548
- Website: www.strathroy-caradoc.ca

Strathroy-Caradoc is a municipality located in Southwestern Ontario, Canada. It is 35 kilometres (22 mi) west of London.

Strathroy-Caradoc is a primarily rural municipality. Industries include turkey and chicken hatching and processing, corn, tobacco, automotive, and pharmaceutical. Some industrial products are manufactured in Strathroy, the township's largest locality and its commercial, cultural and industrial centre. Strathroy's hatcheries have seen it referred to as the turkey capital of Canada and even the world.

Settlements within Strathroy-Caradoc largely grew up around the Sydenham River and the southwestern Ontario railways. Three major railway lines pass through the municipality: the CN (Canadian National Railway) Chatham Subdivision (connecting Windsor and London, Ontario), the CP (Canadian Pacific Railway) Windsor Subdivision (also connecting Windsor and London), and the CN Strathroy Subdivision (connecting London and Sarnia, Ontario).

Municipally, Strathroy-Caradoc is within Middlesex County. At the federal and provincial levels of government it is represented by the riding of Lambton—Kent—Middlesex. It is part of the London census metropolitan area.

== Communities ==
Strathroy-Caradoc's two largest communities are Strathroy and Mount Brydges. The township also contains the smaller communities of Cairngorm, Campbellvale, Caradoc, Christina, Falconbridge, Glen Oak, Longwood, Melbourne (part) and Muncey.

=== Strathroy ===
Strathroy is 35 kilometres west of London, Ontario, and is the largest community in Middlesex County outside London. The community is situated next to Highway 402 between London and the border to Port Huron, Michigan, U.S. at Sarnia, Ontario. Strathroy's economy is diverse, and major industries include automotive manufacturing, agriculture and food processing. The township's administrative offices are located in Strathroy.

=== Mount Brydges ===
Mount Brydges has a small commercial "downtown" featuring mostly local businesses and shops. Local agriculture includes corn, tobacco, soybeans and ginseng. The soil composition of the region is largely sandy (a phenomenon referred to locally as the "Caradoc Sand Plains") as a result of deposits created on the bottom of the glacial Lake Whittlesey which covered the area approximately 13,000 years ago.

The village came into existence as a result of the construction of the western division of the Great Western Railroad from London to Windsor, Ontario, at the point where it crossed the existing road from Delaware, Ontario to Strathroy. This crossing happened to be at the point of greatest elevation on this division, the railroad having just climbed out of the valley of the Thames River from London. The station was named for Charles John Brydges, the managing director of the Grand Trunk Railway from 1861 to 1874. The earlier name Carradoc was replaced in 1856.

== History ==
Strathroy was first settled in 1832 by John Stewart Buchanan, accompanied by the explorer Sir Michael Jacques, at a location on the Sydenham River with flow and fall sufficient to power a gristmill. A general store opened in the settlement in 1840. Strathroy was incorporated as a village in 1860 and became a town in 1872 under the motto "We Advance". Buchanan named the settlement after his hometown of Strathroy in Ireland, now a suburb of Omagh in County Tyrone, Northern Ireland.

In 1866, The Age newspaper was established to compete with the already-established Western Dispatch newspaper. The Western Dispatch was purchased by The Age in 1923, which later became The Age Dispatch. The newspaper is still published weekly.

From 1867 to 1945 the Mount Elgin Indian Residential School operated in Muncey.

Sir Arthur Currie, who would later become the commander of Canadian forces in Europe during World War I, was born here on December 5, 1875.

In the fall of 1876, Bixel Brewery opened in Strathroy, producing lager beer for a century before its closing. Other breweries in the town have included the "Western Steam Brewery", "Strathroy Brewing and Malting" and "West End Brewery".

In 1896, the Strathroy Furniture Company opened its doors, and was renowned for nearly a century for making residential furniture. On July 15, 1992, the company declared bankruptcy and a liquidation sale was held in October 1992.

On February 14, 1914, the first patients were admitted to what would become Strathroy Middlesex General Hospital. At the time, the hospital was municipally owned. The current building opened on June 23, 1962, as a two-story structure with 82 beds. The hospital was the location at which Native Canadian Dudley George succumbed to the gunshot wound he suffered at the Ipperwash Standoff at nearby Ipperwash Provincial Park on September 7, 1995.

On January 13, 1954, West Middlesex Memorial Arena opened in Strathroy. To commemorate the occasion, the NHL's Montreal Canadiens played an exhibition game at the arena, defeating the local Junior 'B' team the Strathroy Rockets 14–3 in front of 3,100 spectators.

In 2001, Strathroy merged with the former Township of Caradoc, creating the town of Strathroy-Caradoc.

On March 22, 2004, the town's 117-year-old train station was destroyed by a fire that took more than 35 firefighters to get under control. Adolescent boys were charged with starting the fire.

In 2005, Strathroy was connected to the Lake Huron Water Pipeline. This ended the town's existing reliance on groundwater and wells.

On August 10, 2016, an Islamic State of Iraq and the Levant supporter from Strathroy, Aaron Driver, was killed in a taxi outside his home, after being shot by Royal Canadian Mounted Police and detonating one of two homemade bombs. The taxi driver was injured. Police suspected he intended to commit a suicide bombing in another public place.

== Demographics ==
Town of Strathroy only
Year	Pop.	±%
1871	3,232	—
1881	3,817	+18.1%
1891	3,316	−13.1%
1901	2,933	−11.6%
1911	2,823	−3.8%
1921	2,691	−4.7%
1931	2,964	+10.1%
1941	3,016	+1.8%
1951	3,708	+22.9%
1961	5,150	+38.9%
1971	6,592	+28.0%
1981	8,748	+32.7%
1991	10,566	+20.8%
2001	12,860	+21.7%
2006	13,541	+5.3%
2011	14,221	+5.0%
2016	14,505	+2.0%
2021	16,056	+10.7%

In the 2021 Census of Population conducted by Statistics Canada, Strathroy-Caradoc had a population of 23,871 living in 9,453 of its 9,695 total private dwellings, a change of 14.4% from its 2016 population of 20,867. With a land area of 270.86 km^{2} (104.58 sq mi), it had a population density of 88.1/km^{2} (228.3/sq mi) in 2021.

Canada census – Strathroy-Caradoc community profile

	2016	2011
Population	20,867 (-0.5% from 2011)	20,978 (+5.1% from 2006)
Land area	270.77 km^{2} (104.54 sq mi)	274.12 km^{2} (105.84 sq mi)
Population density	77.7/km^{2} (201/sq mi)	76.5/km^{2} (198/sq mi)
Median age	43.7 (M: 42.3, F: 45.0)	42.4 (M: 40.7, F: 44.0)
Private dwellings	8,455 (total)	8,162 (total)
Median household income	$71,582

References: 2016 2011

Strathroy-Caradoc
Year	Pop.	±%
1996	17,930	—
2001	19,114	+6.6%
2006	19,977	+4.5%
2011	20,978	+5.0%
2016	20,867	−0.5%
2021	23,871	+14.4%

== Climate ==
Climate data for Strathroy-Caradoc (1991–2020, extremes 1881–present (Note: Long term records have been recorded at various climate stations in or nearby Strathroy since 1881))
Month	Jan	Feb	Mar	Apr	May	Jun	Jul	Aug	Sep	Oct	Nov	Dec	Year
Record high °C (°F)	17.8 (64.0)	20.0 (68.0)	27.5 (81.5)	31.7 (89.1)	34.0 (93.2)	39.0 (102.2)	38.0 (100.4)	37.5 (99.5)	36.7 (98.1)	32.5 (90.5)	25.0 (77.0)	19.5 (67.1)	39.0 (102.2)
Mean daily maximum °C (°F)	−1.5 (29.3)	−0.4 (31.3)	5.1 (41.2)	12.7 (54.9)	19.9 (67.8)	25.0 (77.0)	27.3 (81.1)	26.2 (79.2)	22.8 (73.0)	15.3 (59.5)	7.8 (46.0)	1.5 (34.7)	13.5 (56.3)
Daily mean °C (°F)	−5.0 (23.0)	−4.4 (24.1)	0.7 (33.3)	7.4 (45.3)	14.1 (57.4)	19.3 (66.7)	21.5 (70.7)	20.5 (68.9)	17.0 (62.6)	10.6 (51.1)	4.1 (39.4)	−1.6 (29.1)	8.7 (47.7)
Mean daily minimum °C (°F)	−8.5 (16.7)	−8.3 (17.1)	−3.8 (25.2)	2.1 (35.8)	8.2 (46.8)	13.5 (56.3)	15.7 (60.3)	14.8 (58.6)	11.1 (52.0)	5.8 (42.4)	0.4 (32.7)	−4.7 (23.5)	3.9 (39.0)
Record low °C (°F)	−32.0 (−25.6)	−34.4 (−29.9)	−30.6 (−23.1)	−14.5 (5.9)	−6.7 (19.9)	−2.8 (27.0)	1.1 (34.0)	1.0 (33.8)	−5.6 (21.9)	−10.0 (14.0)	−20.6 (−5.1)	−27.0 (−16.6)	−34.4 (−29.9)
Average precipitation mm (inches)	80.8 (3.18)	61.7 (2.43)	66.1 (2.60)	87.7 (3.45)	84.4 (3.32)	86.2 (3.39)	77.6 (3.06)	80.8 (3.18)	87.7 (3.45)	84.1 (3.31)	89.5 (3.52)	79.0 (3.11)	965.5 (38.01)
Average rainfall mm (inches)	38.1 (1.50)	29.5 (1.16)	45.7 (1.80)	82.8 (3.26)	84.3 (3.32)	86.2 (3.39)	77.6 (3.06)	80.8 (3.18)	87.7 (3.45)	82.1 (3.23)	76.2 (3.00)	41.3 (1.63)	812.2 (31.98)
Average snowfall cm (inches)	42.7 (16.8)	32.2 (12.7)	20.4 (8.0)	4.9 (1.9)	0.1 (0.0)	0.0 (0.0)	0.0 (0.0)	0.0 (0.0)	0.0 (0.0)	2.2 (0.9)	13.3 (5.2)	36.5 (14.4)	152.3 (60.0)
Average precipitation days (≥ 0.2 mm)	16.3	12.0	12.4	13.4	12.3	10.6	11.0	10.4	10.2	14.1	13.2	14.0	150.1
Average rainy days (≥ 0.2 mm)	5.4	4.3	8.0	12.2	12.3	10.6	11.0	10.4	10.2	13.9	10.6	6.8	115.6
Average snowy days (≥ 0.2 cm)	12.1	8.6	5.4	2.0	0.07	0.0	0.0	0.0	0.0	0.48	3.7	8.4	40.7
Source: Environment and Climate Change Canada

== Education ==
Strathroy has two secondary schools that share basic facilities, Strathroy District Collegiate Institute and Holy Cross Catholic Secondary School. Each serves the town and its outlying area. Strathroy was ranked 161st out of 714 Ontario secondary schools in 2007/2008 by the Fraser Institute's Report on Ontario Secondary Schools. Holy Cross was ranked 339th out of 714 in the same report.

== Media ==
Strathroy has two weekly newspapers, The Age Dispatch and the Middlesex Banner, and a radio station, 105.7 myFM (CJMI-FM), which provides local news and sports coverage. The region is otherwise served by media from London.

== Events ==
Strathroy's largest annual event is the Strathroy Hometown Turkey Festival, also known as Turkeyfest, run in June. The town is home to the headquarters of Cuddy Farms, the world's top turkey-hatching company.

== Sports ==
Strathroy Rockets home game

Strathroy is home to the Strathroy Rockets of the Greater Ontario Hockey League and the Strathroy Royals baseball team. Mount Brydges is home to the Mount Brydges Bulldogs of the Provincial Junior Hockey League. The Strathroy Rockets won the Championship of the Western Ontario Hockey League in 2007. Strathroy also has many minor and youth sports teams such at the Strathroy Jr. Rockets Minor Hockey Association, a baseball program known as the Strathroy Jr. Royals, and a Soccer program known as Strathroy United FC. All of these sport associations have won various titles throughout Ontario.

== Notable people ==
- Nathan Beaulieu, defenceman for the Winnipeg Jets and 2011 Memorial Cup Champion
- Harry H. Bentley, politician
- Robert Brett, politician, physician
- Brian Campbell, Chicago Blackhawks, NHL All-Star defenceman and 2010 Stanley Cup Champion.
- William W. Chalmers
- Easton Cowan, 1st round pick 2023 NHL entry draft
- Lawson Crouse, ice hockey player
- Arthur Currie, commander of the Canadian Corps during the First World War.
- Chris Daw, Multi attending Paralympic athlete and 2006 wheelchair curling Gold medalist
- Darryl Edestrand, NHL hockey player
- Francis Henry Keefer, Canadian lawyer and politician
- Rapley Holmes (1868 – 1928) - Stage and screen actor
- Penn Kemp (b.1944), poet
- Alexander Knox (1907–1995), actor and author
- William Bethune Lindsay, chief engineer of the Canadian Corps in the First World War.
- The Hon. Charles Herbert Mackintosh (1843–1931), town councillor, Strathroy, owner of the Strathroy Dispatch, later mayor of Ottawa, owner of the Ottawa Citizen, Member of Parliament, and lieutenant-governor (1893–1898) of the old Northwest Territories
- John Burton Martyn, politician
- Andy McDonald, retired NHL All-Star forward and 2007 Stanley Cup Champion
- Steve McKichan, former NHL player, and former goalie coach for the Toronto Maple Leafs
- Tara McLeod, guitarist for Ontario-based metal band Kittie
- George Orton, Canada's first Olympic champion, born in Strathroy in 1873. Won a gold medal for the Canada in the steeplechase event at the 1900 Olympics
- Warren Rychel, NHL hockey player
- Seth, cartoonist and author of It's a Good Life, If You Don't Weaken that is set in Strathroy and Southern Ontario.
- James T. Shotwell, historian and human rights activist
- Craig Small, Canadian visual artist, director and animator
- Pat Stapleton, retired Canadian ice hockey defenceman who played 15 seasons in the National Hockey League and the World Hockey Association
- Mike Stapleton, retired ice hockey forward who played 697 games for 8 NHL teams, and won a silver medal at the 1986 World Junior Championships.
- Janaya Stephens, film actress
- Clara Thomas, academic specializing in Canadian literature
- Kimberly Tuck, curler
- Don Van Massenhoven, NHL official
- Anna May Waters (1903–1987), Canadian nurse

== See also ==
- List of townships in Ontario
