= Gabrielle Bernard =

Belgian poet

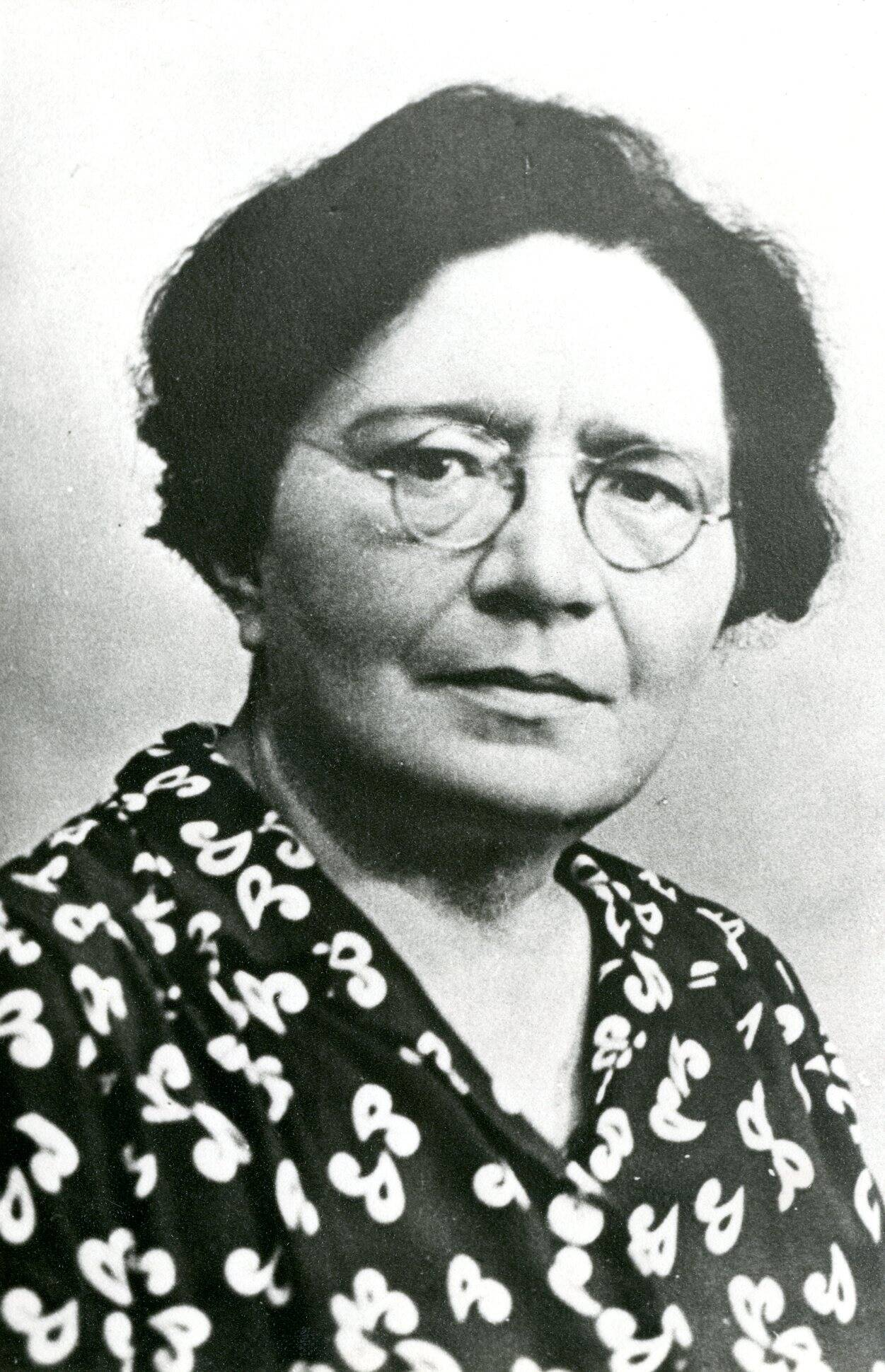
- Bernard c. 1940
- Born: March 26, 1893
- Died: February 13, 1963 (aged 69)
- Occupations: Poet; Novelist; Playwright
- Writing career
- Notable works: Do vète, do nwâr; C'esteûve ayîr

Gabrielle Bernard (1893–1963) was a Belgian poet writing in Walloon and French. She is most well-remembered for her work in Walloon, which has been republished numerous times.

== Early life ==
Gabrielle Bernard was born at Moustier-sur-Sambre on "26 March 1896 at 9 P.M.," as specified by her birth certificate. She would live in that municipality her entire life until her death in 1963.

She learned to read at the age of four, thanks to the influence of her neighbour, Mrs. David, the wife of a chemical worker. The other significant figure in her childhood was her godfather, François-Joseph Trefois dit Maugis, under whose name she would publish her first works several years later.

She did not receive any education beyond primary school, due to her poor health. She nonetheless received an advanced education, delivered in part by the Dominican sisters in her village. She wrote her first French-language texts when she was 10 years old, her first verse when she was 12, and her first novel when she was 14. She studied Latin, Ancient Greek, English, Italian, Spanish, and Dutch, and she could read German, Portuguese, and Provençal.

She dreamed of being a headmistress, but became a factory worker.

She left to work in Brussels in 1918, intent on getting closer to the literary circles of the city. She gave up on that plan, due to her shyness and a road accident, which negatively impacted her health. In 1920, she returned to Moustier-sur-Sambre, where she was hired as a secretary at the Ateliers de la Basse-Sambre.

== Work ==
=== French ===
In 1936, her collection of symbolist poetry En attendant la caravelle (Waiting for the Caravel), was published in Châtelet under the pseudonym F.-José Maugis, inspired by her godfather. For this publication, Bernard was assisted by Paul Moureau and Eugène Gillain, two figures of the local literary scene. The collection was received well by critics, notably in the newspapers La Libre Belgique and Le Vingtième Siècle.

An anecdote that asserts that Gabrielle Bernard lost her fiancé during World War I and that her solitude was the spark of her literary inspiration appears to be spurious.

Following her collection of poetry, four novels appeared in edited versions, published by Dupuis. In total, Gabrielle Bernard authored 9 novels in French: L'infante au masque (The Masked Infanta), Le Collier de plomb (The Lead Necklace), La Lampe inutile (The Useless Lamp), Le Vœu des ténèbres (The Vow of Darkness), Elisabeth, Tchiroute, L'imposteur (The Impostor), L'Étrange Aventure de Mademoiselle Fauste (The Strange Adventure of Mademoiselle Fauste), Polyphème et la Gitane (Polyphemus and the Gypsy). In 1939, she contributed to the literary journal Les Lettres mosanes, edited by François Bovesse and Adelin-Pierre Dohet.

=== Walloon ===
Around 1930, after she had stopped writing in French, Bernard was contacted by Ernest Montellier, who invited her to gatherings of the dialectal literary circle Lès Rèlîs Namurès ("The Namurois Chosen"). She became a member in 1930, and in 1933, she received the cockade for the member who had made the most notable work in that year.

In 1931, she won silver at the 24th competition of the Walloon Language and Literature Society for her first collection of poetry C'esteûve ahîr (It Was Yesterday), which was subsequently published in the Society's Bulletin. That collection was republished in 1943 by Eugène Gillain in a special edition of Les Cahiers wallons that he put together with Paul Moureau. Her next two collections, Boles di savon (Soap Bubbles) and Do vète, do nwâr (Green, Black), were published in the same way during World War II, while the periodical was unable to publish its typical anthology format.

Her work was inspired by the life she led in the area of Moustier-sur-Sambre, namely the Basse-Sambre. Her first poetry collections were full of rural images, while in Do vète, do nwâr, she dealt with the work and daily life of miners. Folklore also inspired her play Flora dal Hoûlote, which was put on at the Théâtre royal de Namur, and turned into a radio drama for the RTBF in the 1980s. That play won Bernard the Government's triennial prize in 1946.

In January 1950, she received the support of two out of eight jury members for the 1949 edition of the Biennial Prize for Walloon Literature of the City of Liège for her poetic oeuvre. She won this prestigious prize the following year, becoming the first woman to do so. The following year, she was elevated to the level of Honoured Member of the Rèlîs Namurwès.

In 1979, she was one of the authors selected by Maurice Piron for his Anthology of Dialectal Literature of Wallonia. She has been translated into English by Yann Lovelock, who has had Bernard's poems published in the anthologies The Colour of the Weather (1980), and Summoning the Sea (1996) and two journals, the Indian literary journal Skylark (#47-48) and the Scottish literary journal Trends (#3/6).

== Reception ==
Pierre Pirard, editor of the literary page of La Libre Belgique, compared Gabrielle Bernard's French oeuvre (specifically her classical verses in En attendant la caravelle) to the style of Albert Samain.

As for the other half of her literary work, the dialectologist Marie-Thérèse Bettonville-Counet named Gabrielle Bernard among the Walloon language writers who, over the course of the 20th century, "pushed for exploration of the intimate, the individual, the mysterious." Further:

Mais Namur s’active et innove dans l'émotion, l'anticonformisme, la confidence. La sensibilité de Gabrielle BERNARD (1893-1963) exploite largement dans C’esteûve ayîr [1932], Li vî viladje [1934] et Boles di savon (1942), le tableau villageois au naturel terrien. Sombre résignation du Pays noir et fougue dosée se disputent dans un style souvent oral. On s’en inspirera…

[But Namur comes alive and innovates with emotion, non-conformity, confidence. The sensibility of Gabrielle BERNARD (1893-1963) makes great use in "C'esteûve ayîr" [1932], "Li vî viladje" [1934] and "Boles di savon" (1942) of candid, earthy village scenes. The sombre resignation of the Black country and widespread passion grapple with each other in a style that is often oral. We are inspired...]

— Marie-Thérèse Bettonville-Counet, "Littérature et philologie namuroises à la Société de Langue et de Littérature wallonnes: un esprit, un parcours, des perspectives…", Les Rèlîs Namurwès

Jean Guillaume, for his part, underlines the humbleness of the themes addressed in Bernard's Walloon-language poetry, as well as the quality of her writing. He notes that with Bernard, things are expressed either reservedly or naturally, while avoiding all excesses.

The critic Jules-Louis Tellier called her "Queen of the Walloon Félibrige."

== Legacy ==
She was the first great female poet of the Walloon language and led the way for a series of female writers after her, including Marcelle Martin, Jeanne Houbart-Houge, Geneviève Pittelioen, Jenny d'Inverno, Josée Spinosa-Mathot, Chantal Denis, Danielle Trempont, and Rose-Marie François.

The cultural centre at Moustier-sur-Sambre is named after Gabrielle Bernard. Destroyed in a fire in 2009, it was rebuilt with a library and two rooms able to fit 200 people, and an entry hall that can also serve as a gallery space. Three-quarters of the cost of the reconstruction (around €4,000,000) was taken on by insurance companies, the rest paid for by the commune.
