= Geoffrey B. Small =

Geoffrey B. Small is an American fashion designer and head of his eponymous made in Italy luxury clothing brand. Production is entirely hand-made in Carvazere, Veneto, Italy. Geoffrey B. Small sources supplies from local artisans: fabrics, buttons, and garment boxes. In 2003 Small founded the Area Paris show to showcase independent designers. Geoffrey B. Small has presented more than 100 collections in Paris since 1993, more than any other American designer.

== Clientele ==
Veruschka, Winona Ryder, Halle Berry, Jeremy Strong, and David Beckham are clients of the brand.

== Awards and honors ==
Small won the 2005 MTV Germany's Designerama award for menswear. In 1979 and 1980 ILGWU Americas recognized him in the "Next Great Designer Awards". He was the third American recognized by France's Chambre Syndicale.

== See also ==
- List of grand couturiers
