= Robert Small =

Robert Small may refer to:

- Robert Small (minister) (1732–1808), Scottish minister, Moderator of the General Assembly of the Church of Scotland, mathematician and astronomer
- Robert Small (producer), American entertainment producer
- Robert Small (trade unionist) (1873–1918), Scottish trade unionist and socialist activist
- Robert Hardy Small (1891–1976), Canadian politician, Member of Parliament for Danforth

== See also ==
- Robert Smalls (1839–1915), freed slave and United States politician
