= Henry Small =

Henry Small may refer to:

- Henry Beaumont Small (1831–1919), Canadian civil servant and naturalist
- Henry Small (footballer) (c. 1881–1946), English footballer who played as an inside forward of the 1900s (Southampton, Manchester United)
- Henry Small (information scientist), American bibliometricist known for describing co-citations
- Henry Small (singer) (born 1948), American-born Canadian rock musician and recording artist
