= Sterling Small =

American politician

Member of the Montana House of Representatives from the 41st district
- In office 2011 to 2013
- Preceded by: Rae Peppers

Personal details
- Party: Republican

Sterling Small is a former Republican member of the Montana House of Representatives. He represented District 41 from 2010 to 2012, until his defeat by Rae Peppers.
