= Smallman =

Smallman is an English surname. Notable people with the surname include:

- Basil Smallman (1921–2001), English music scholar
- David Leslie Smallman, Governor of Saint Helena, Ascension and Tristan da Cunha between 1995 and 1999
- David Smallman (born 1953), Welsh footballer
- Francis Smallman (1565–1633), English politician
- Frank Smallman (1869–1941), English professional footballer
- Jim Smallman, stand-up comedian, radio presenter, professional wrestling promoter, blogger and voice-over artist.
- Mina Smallman (born 1956), English priest
- Raymond Smallman (1929–2015), British metallurgist and academic
- William Smallman (1615–1643), English politician

== Fictional characters ==
- Great Rabbi Smallman of Venus in On Venus, Have We Got a Rabbi!
