= Craig Small =

Canadian visual artist and director

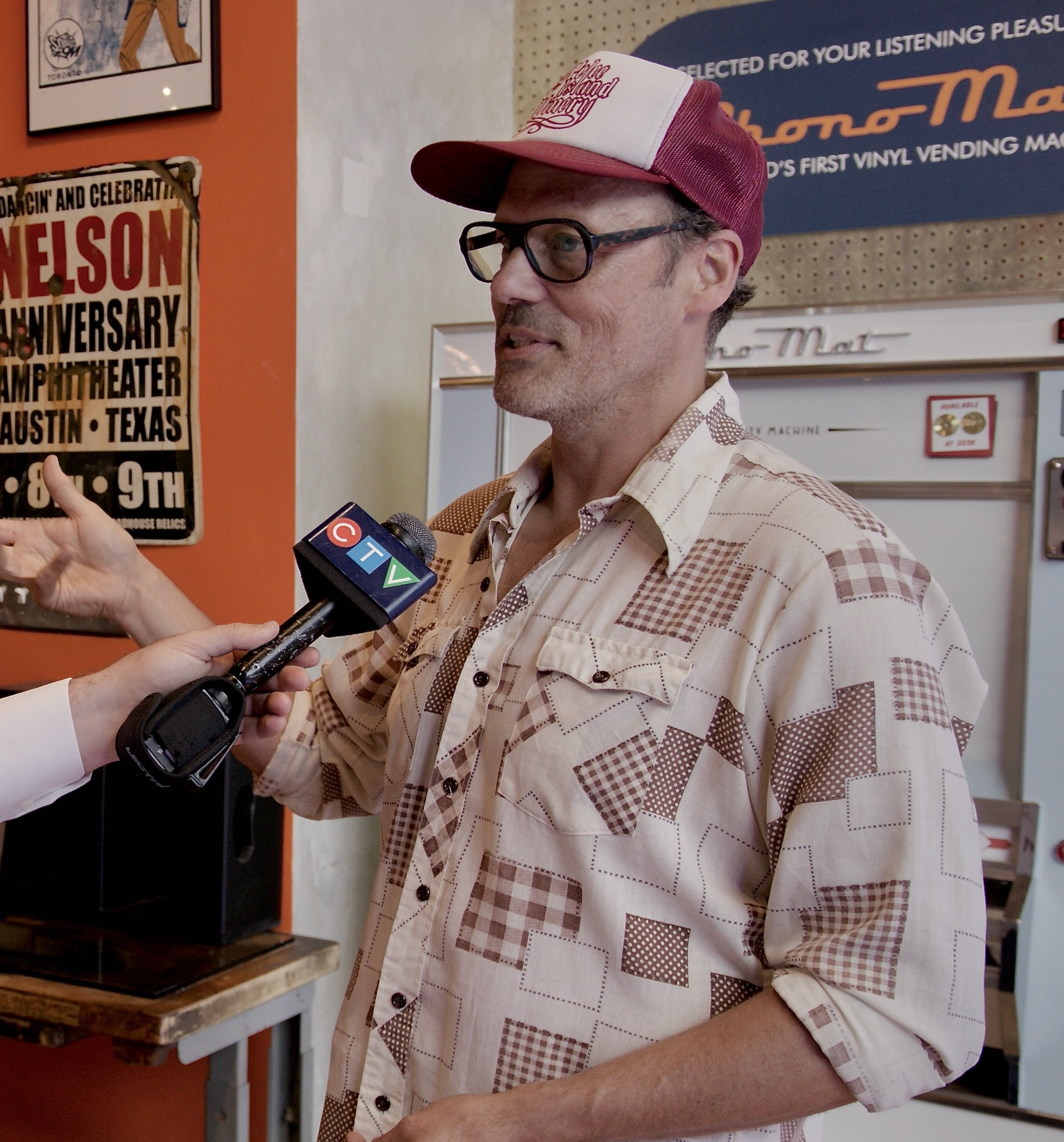
- Craig Small in 2022
- Born: July 5, 1969 (age 56); Galt, Ontario, Canada
- Occupations: Visual artist; director; animator
- Years active: 1990s–present

Craig Small (born July 5, 1969) is a Canadian visual artist, director and animator known for his motion graphic work and the Biblio-Mat book vending machine. He founded Toronto-based design and production studio The Juggernaut in 2002 and is a member of the band Communism.

== Early life ==
Small was born in Galt, Ontario, to Nova Scotian parents and grew up in Strathroy, Ontario. His father worked in the automotive industry. From an early age, Small was fascinated with computer graphics and animation and spent much of his youth disassembling video games.

== Career ==
=== Film and television ===
Small began his career as a broadcast designer at the Canadian Broadcasting Corporation (CBC) in the early 1990s and went on to work at several design and post-production houses in Toronto before founding his own production studio, The Juggernaut, in 2002. He has directed and produced animation, visual effects and title sequences for numerous commercials, feature films, documentaries, music videos as well as identities for companies including Sony, Ubisoft, Disney and Coca-Cola. In 2000, Small created the branding for the I Am Canadian ad campaign that premiered during the 72nd Academy Awards. He worked with the National Film Board of Canada (NFB) on the animated films Madame Tutli-Putli (2007) and Subconscious Password (2013). In 2012, Small developed the experimental film KENK, based on the journalistic comic Kenk: A Graphic Portrait that incorporated Small's genre-bending style of animation. It was showcased at the International Documentary Film Festival Amsterdam (IDFA) and later adapted into a broadcast documentary by TVO in 2019.

=== Serendipity machines ===
==== Biblio-Mat ====
In 2012, Small created the Biblio-Mat, the first in a series of random vending, or serendipity machines. In the case of the Biblio-Mat, the insertion of a two-dollar coin or "toonie" (now a token), prompts the machine to randomly select an antiquarian book that is delivered to the chime of an antique telephone bell.

Small said, in an interview with CTV News, "You don't choose the book, the universe chooses it for you."

The Biblio-Mat garnered worldwide media attention and admiration, including from authors Margaret Atwood, who tweeted “This! Is! Brilliant!” and Neil Gaiman, who said “A random used-book vending machine—I think I am in love.”

==== Literarium ====
In 2021, musician Jack White, a Biblio-Mat fan, commissioned Small to build a “token-operated lucky dip book machine” for the opening of Third Man Records London. The Literarium, as it is known, dispenses random literature published by Third Man Books.

==== Phono-Mat ====
Small's third serendipity machine, the Phono-Mat, which dispenses random vinyl records, was created in 2022 for Sonic Boom Records in Toronto. Jack White and the band July Talk attended the machine's launch before performing at White's Supply Chain Issues Tour concert in Toronto.

=== Live visual performer ===
Small has been performing with the band Communism as a VJ since 2017. His video and laser projections have been featured at Atlin Arts & Music Festival the Danforth Music Hall and the National Arts Centre. Small designed the album artwork for the band's 2023 album, Lovespeech, incorporating elements from his live projections.

== Personal life ==
Small is married to writer/editor Emily Donaldson and lives in Toronto with their two sons. He plays competitive pinball with his autistic son.
