= Victor Smal =

Ukrainian politician

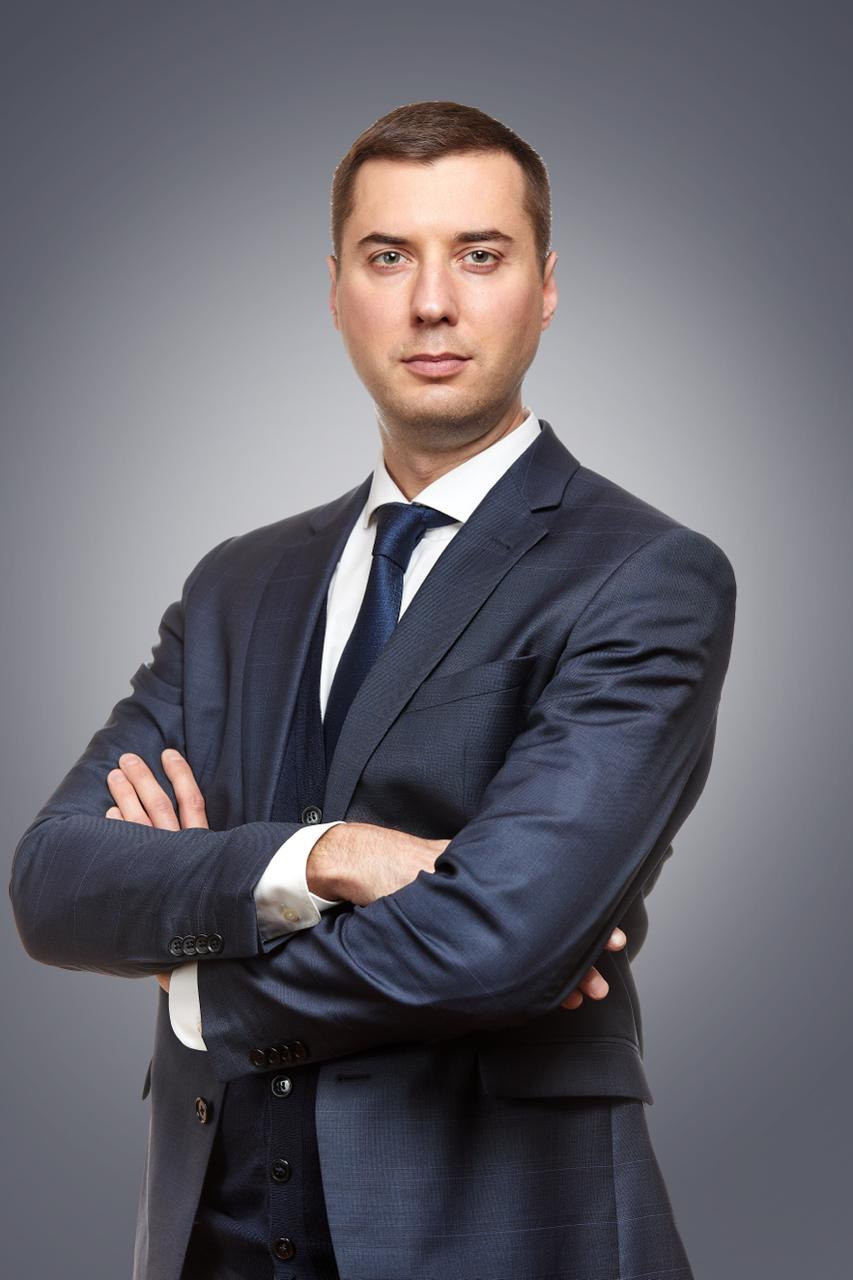

Head of the State Forest Resources Agency of Ukraine
- Incumbent
- Assumed office 19 December 2023
- Preceded by: Yuriy Bolokhovets

Personal details
- Born: August 1, 1984 (age 42) Kyiv, Ukraine
- Citizenship: Ukraine
- Children: 2 sons
- Education: Taras Shevchenko National University of Kyiv; Ukrainian National Forestry University
- Occupation: Government official, politician

Victor Ihorovych Smal (Ukrainian: Віктор Ігорович Смаль; born 1 August 1984) is a Ukrainian politician who has served as the head of the State Forest Resources Agency of Ukraine (SFRA) since 19 December 2023.

== Early life and education ==
Smal attended the Nizhyn City Lyceum at the Nizhyn Gogol State University, from which he graduated with a gold medal. He also studied at Laramie High School in the United States.

In 2007, he graduated from the Taras Shevchenko National University of Kyiv with a degree in international relations, qualifying as a political scientist and translator of Spanish. While studying, he worked as an assistant-consultant to Member of Parliament of Ukraine Mykhailo Volynets.

From 2007 to 2013, he worked in the private sector and achieved. He headed the Boryspil branch of AVIS Ukraine, an international car rental and leasing franchising company. He served as foreign economic activity manager at the LAZ Ukraine holding (urban transport manufacturing). As senior consultant at Cybarco Limited (part of Lanitis Group, Cyprus), he established a network for the sale of Cypriot real estate in Ukraine.

In 2013, he founded and developed the IT agency WebAnatomia, which specialised in web production.

In 2024, he earned a master's degree in forestry from the Ukrainian National Forestry University in Lviv.

Smal speaks English and Spanish.

== Government service ==
In February 2021, Smal left private business and was appointed deputy head of the State Forest Resources Agency of Ukraine, responsible for digital development, digital transformation and digitalisation in the forestry sector. In December 2023, he was appointed head of the agency.

As deputy and later head of the State Forest Resources Agency of Ukraine, Smal initiated and implemented several digital solutions for the forestry industry, including:

- the launch of the electronic logging ticket;
- the introduction of an e-certificate confirming the origin of timber;
- the creation of the state online platform “DrovaYe” for ordering firewood;
- the expansion of mandatory use of the electronic timber accounting system.

Under his leadership, the agency reported economic and environmental results. In 2025, the net profit of the forestry sector amounted to UAH 6.9 billion, compared to approximately UAH 200 million prior to the start of sectoral reforms in 2020. These figures were recorded in the context of a full-scale war, despite the loss of part of the resource base due to occupation and a reduction in the area available for management, including as a result of landmine contamination of forest territories. At the same time, the annual timber increment exceeds harvesting volumes. In 2025, timber harvesting amounted to 11.7 million m³, while the annual natural increment is estimated at approximately 35 million m³.

Smal oversaw the full implementation of President Volodymyr Zelenskyy's “Green Country” programme, which continued even during the full-scale war. As part of this initiative, one billion trees were planted.

He also oversaw key regulatory and forest-protection reforms:

- regulation of logging to account for defence and national security needs;
- a ban on clear-cutting for main use in the Carpathians;
- the adoption of close-to-nature forestry methods;
- the modernisation of timber transportation controls through electronic waybills with mandatory photo and geolocation verification.

== Personal life ==
Smal's father, Ihor Victorovych Smal, is a professor in the Department of Tourism and Hotel and Restaurant Business at King Danylo University in Ivano-Frankivsk, a Candidate of Geographical Sciences, associate professor and member of the Ukrainian Geographical Society. He is a veteran of the Russo-Ukrainian War.

His mother, Valentyna Volodymyrivna Smal, holds a Doctor of Geography degree. She was a professor in the Department of Geography at the Faculty of Natural Sciences of Nizhyn Gogol State University and a specialist in professional education for the United Nations Development Programme.

Victor Smal is married and has two sons.
