= John Small =

John Small may refer to:

== Politicians ==
- John Small (Canadian politician, born 1746) (1746–1841), political figure in Upper Canada
- John Small (Canadian politician, born 1831) (1831–1909), member of the Canadian House of Commons
- John Francis Small (1853–1923), Member of the United Kingdom Parliament for County Wexford
- John Humphrey Small (1858–1946), U.S. Representative from North Carolina

== Sportspeople ==
- John Small (cricketer) (1737–1826), English cricketer
- Jack Small (1765–1836), English cricketer
- John Small (American football) (1946–2012), American football player
- John Small (Gaelic footballer) (born 1993), Gaelic footballer

== Military figures ==
- John Small (British Army officer) (1726–1796), active in the American Revolutionary War
- John Small (gunsmith) (1759–1821), American gunsmith, sheriff, and first Indiana Adjutant General
- John Small (British Army medical officer) (1823–1879), British Army deputy surgeon-general

== Others ==
- John Small (librarian) (1828–1886), librarian of the University of Edinburgh
- John Bryan Small (died 1915), African-American bishop in the AME Zion Church
- John Kunkel Small (1869–1938), American botanist

== See also ==
- Jon Small (1947–2026), American drummer and director
- Jonathan Small, a character in the novel The Sign of the Four
