= Annika Small =

Annika Elisabeth Small OBE is a social entrepreneur focused on using digital technologies to address social challenges. Issues targeted include healthcare, social isolation, homelessness, domestic abuse and persistent poverty. Examples include online peer mentoring for those experiencing bullying, the first online clinical research trial, the iDEA programme for young digital entrepreneurs and new forms of micro-volunteering to help those experiencing loneliness are some examples. Small is the founder of CAST and former Chief Executive of Nominet Trust.

Prior to Nominet Trust, Small founded and led the Tony Blair Institute's global education programme, Generation Global, where she used digital technologies to bring together young people of different cultures around the world to learn directly with, from and about each other. Prior to this, Small was Chief Executive of Futurelab, an educational R&D organisation chaired by Lord Puttnam, which develops radically new approaches to teaching and learning. Small is a recipient of a BETT Award for special achievement in education and technology

Small is a member of BAFTA and a Fellow of the RSA. She has been Chair of the University of Chichester, a non-executive of Wey Education and a Trustee of Founders4Schools. She has also been a Trustee of the Design Council, a non-executive Director of Lightful and Senior Independent Director of the Access Foundation. She is currently a Trustee at the John Ellerman Foundation and a non-executive Director of Care Unbound.
