= Smail (disambiguation) =

Smail is a mail transfer agent used on Unix-like operating systems.

Smail may also refer to:

- Snail mail, a disparaging retronym referring to missives carried by conventional postal delivery services
- Robert Smail's Printing Works, a Victorian-era letterpress printing works in the Scottish Borders town of Innerleithen

== People with the surname ==
- David Smail (golfer) (born 1970), New Zealand professional golfer
- David Smail (psychologist) (born 1938), British clinical psychologist
- Doug Smail (born 1957), Canadian ice hockey left winger
- John R.W. Smail (1930-2002), Cornell historian of Southeast Asia
- Thomas Smail (born 1928), Scottish theologian
