= Phil Small (journalist) =

Australian media personality

- Employer: Australian Federal Police (Previously WIN Television)
- Spouse: Judy Small
- Children: 2

Phil Small is an Australian media personality/broadcaster.

Began his working career as an apprentice chef and then undertook studies in Horticulture under a four year government apprenticeship scheme in Canberra.Phil then moved into media firstly as a producer/on air broadcaster at 2CA in Canberra and then ABC radio as a producer reporter.

Joining WIN News Canberra in 1989 as a general news reporter, he later became the station's sports presenter,news journalist and back up news reader to close friend Peter Leonard, a position he held for twenty years.

Small also hosted WIN programs League Round Up and Sports Arena and was the emcee for numerous sporting and charity functions as well as representing on the board for the Canberra men’s centre and as a White Ribbon ambassador in the ACT.

. (journalist)|.

In early June 2009, Small announced he was leaving WIN, accepting a job within the Australian Federal Police's communications department after working closely on the design of the new Communications model for the organisation. His final bulletin was on Friday 26 July 2009.

Maintaining involvement as an NRL commentator now for MIX 106 in Canberra,Small lives on the South Coast of NSW with his wife Judy. He has also commentated on Rugby Union, Basketball and Gridiron for both radio and television. and still contributes his time to a number of local charities and organisations in Canberra.

He has won several ACRA radio awards including an individual category award.

Preceded by Originator (previously by news presenter)	WIN News Canberra sports presenter and reporter 1989 - 2009	Succeeded by Lachlan Kennedy and Erin Molan
