= George Small =

George Small may refer to:

- George Small (American football) (born 1956), American football coach and former player
- George Small (musician), musician, composer and producer
- George Small (piano maker) (1782–1861), Scottish piano maker, music publisher and philanthropist
