= Daniel R. Small =

American artist

Daniel Small
- Born: 1984 (age 41–42); Centralia, Illinois, United States
- Education: Stanford University; Brown University; Rhode Island School of Design; San Francisco Art Institute
- Known for: artificial intelligence • technology • filmmaking • media theory • media archaeology • photography • writing • art • anthropology • teaching
- Notable work: Techne • Excavation II • Animus Mneme • Shadows of Several Ages • Pending Cipher for the Open Present
- Spouse: Erica Blumenthal
- Website: https://danielrsmall.com/

Daniel R. Small (born 1984) is an entrepreneur, filmmaker, media theorist, and contemporary artist based in Los Angeles, California. He is the co-founder of Thumos, an AI platform focused on building reusable interpretive frameworks called Frames for adapting source materials across different contexts. Small's work connects art, technology, storytelling, media archaeology, and archival research. His films, installations, and interventions have been featured at institutions and galleries including the Hammer Museum (Los Angeles, California), Institut d'Art Contemporain Villeurbanne/Rhone-Alps (Lyon, France), The Swedish Contemporary Art Foundation (Stockholm, Sweden), Match Gallery at Museum of Ljubljana (Ljubljana, Slovenia), SculptureCenter (Long Island City, New York), 21st Century Museum of Contemporary Art (Kanazawa, Japan), Eli and Edythe Broad Art Museum (East Lansing, Michigan). He has received numerous awards, including the Smithsonian Ingenuity Award (2015), Rema Hort Mann Foundation Award (2016), Teaching Advancement Award at ArtCenter College of Design (2019), Department of Cultural Affairs Los Angeles Award (2020), Adolph and Esther Gottlieb Foundation Award (2021), and the LACMA Art+Technology Lab Fellowship (2022).

== Early life and education ==
Daniel R. Small was born in Centralia, Illinois in 1984. He graduated from Lois Cowles Harrison Center for the Visual and Performing Arts in 2002, and went on to receive his BFA in a dual degree from Rhode Island School of Design and Brown University in 2006. He obtained his MFA in New Genres from San Francisco Art Institute in 2010.

== Work ==
His work engages with speculative pasts and futures through interventions in sites, narratives, and technologies. He has also engaged with organizations such as the Federal Bureau of Investigation, NASA Jet Propulsion Laboratory, UNESCO, and others, working alongside these institutions to set up various thought experiments or interventions within pre-existing research systems or archives.

=== Films ===
Small is developing an episodic documentary series titled "Techne", supported by the Los Angeles County Museum of Art (LACMA) Art + Technology fellowship. The series is based on diverse sets of research from a wide range of experts in fields such as philosophy, zoology, astrophysics, planetary science, robotics, and artificial intelligence. The series aims to put modern scientific researchers in conversation with contemporary artists.

The premiere screening of the first installment of Techne was held at California Institute of Technology's historic Beckman Auditorium. Small appeared on a panel following the screening with Senior Research Scientist Jonathan H. Jiang from NASA JPL and Ann Druyan American author and Creative Director of the Voyager Golden Record. The panel consisted of an announcement of an effort to revise the Voyager Golden Record in an ongoing project spearheaded by Jonathan H. Jiang called Message in a Bottle. Small will be following Message in a Bottle's effort while Directing and Producing an upcoming film about the internal committee and the various challenges they face.

=== Animus Mneme ===
As part of the "74 million million million tons" exhibit held at SculptureCenter in Long Island City, New York, Small displayed a group of museological works, collectively labeled Animus Mneme (2018). The works consider the mechanisms around human interventions into the concept of time, bringing new immortality movements and modern technological advances together with ancient devices and premodern ideas about animism.

One of his works is a video interview of BINA48, an android replica of Bina Aspen made by Hanson Robotics for her partner, Dr. Martine Rothblatt. Rothblatt is the founder of the Terasem Movement foundation, which proposes that one person's consciousness may be transferred to another biological or technological form. In the interview Bina48 speaks to her condition as a robot that is learning to be more human and that will conceivably live forever. The interview is placed in relation to casts in Aerogel made to look like fragments from the Antikythera mechanism, an ancient astronomical computer discovered in a Greek shipwreck dating from 60 BC.

Other parts of the installation look at different factions of transhumanist thought. In a video titled "Terasem Teyolía", Small includes footage taken from the computer servers of members of the Transhumanist Movement, who upload all their memories to be broadcast into space with the intention that they will someday be retrieved and used. The video also includes footage of the Otomi Ceremonial Center in Mexico, where extinct and endangered animals have been rendered as topiary bushes. Additionally Small includes the drawings of Russian transhumanist Alexey Turchin, which Turchin made while hooked up to an electroencephalography, used to preserve measurements of his brainwaves to be input into a future android. Small interprets the drawings as animist images, sculpting a three dimensional tree like sculptural form called "Wood Spirit".

=== Excavation II ===
As part of the Hammer Museum's 2016 biennial "Made in L.A." exhibit, as well as in the traveling exhibition "Never Spoken Again" organized by Independent Curators International, Small displays his work "Excavation II" (2016). The work is an archeological excavation of the film set used in Cecil B. DeMille's The Ten Commandments in 1923. The film was shot at the Guadalupe-Nipomo Dunes on the Central California Coast, and the set, which was destroyed and buried to prevent further use, was modeled after the ancient Egyptian city of Pi-Ramesses.

In his excavation, Small recovers pseudo antiques made of wood and plaster from the ruins of the imagined city and displays them in the installation. Each item on display includes stories related to its creation and history of the film set. The assemblage additionally includes paintings and pseudo hieroglyphic sculpting from the Luxor Hotel in Las Vegas.

=== Pending Cipher for the Open Present ===
Small participated in the "Manifest Destiny Billboard Project", organized by the Los Angeles Nomadic Division, consisting of artist-produced billboards installed alongside the Interstate 10 Freeway from Florida to California from 2013 to 2015. Small's contribution, "Pending Cipher for the Open Present", was a series of billboards displayed in New Mexico, consisting of black text in a fictional language from the Los Lunas Decalogue Stone meant to depict pre-Columbian interpretations of the Ten Commandments. The text is decorated with red modern proofreading marks and superimposed on photographs of the California desert site where Cecil B. DeMille buried the set of his film The Ten Commandments.

Small's work generated controversy in the surrounding community of Las Cruces. Residents interpreted the foreign written language as an indicator of terrorist or satanic presence, with some harassing the workers installing the billboards in person. The billboards may have been mistakenly referred to by Michael Flynn as Arabic signs promoting Islamic radicalization.

=== Caveat Emptor ===
In 2013, Small and artist Stephan Apicella-Hitchcock co-curated the show "Caveat Emptor" at the Fordham University Lincoln Center in New York City. The show depicts a series of forgeries of famous works by artists such as Rembradt van Rijn, Willem de Kooning, and Andy Warhol. The show featured 13 paintings and one sculpture, with the forgeries drawn from the holdings of the FBI Forgery Division. The show was held in conjunction with Fordham University's International Conference on Cyber Security, and the gallery space was used as the central registration room for the conference.

=== Present Perfect ===
"Present Perfect" is a 2013 collaboration show between Small and artist Luca Antonucci. The artists have displayed a scaled-down, slightly damaged replica of the Winged Victory of Samothrace, obtained from a supply yard connected to Caesar's Palace in Las Vegas. Included on a nearby wall are two cast metal discs depicting the Winged Victory, one from a Soviet-era coin, and the other a 10-dollar chip from Caesar's Palace. The show also included a photoshopped poster with an aerial view of Las Vegas, a petrified stone teddy bear from a cave in Yorkshire, England, and a series of fragments from a fake classical sculpture sourced from the Caesar's Palace scrap heap.

== Awards ==
- LACMA Art + Technology grant recipient, 2022
- Adolph and Esther Gottlieb Foundation Award, 2021
- Department of Cultural Affairs Los Angeles Award, 2020
- Teaching Advancement Award at ArtCenter College of Design, 2019
- Rema Hort Mann Foundation Award, 2016
- Smithsonian Ingenuity Award, 2015
