= Neptune Small =

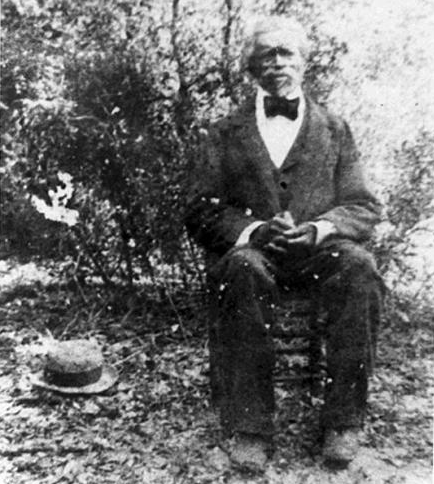
Neptune Small

Neptune Small (September 15, 1831 – August 10, 1907) was a slave of the Thomas Butler King family at Retreat Plantation, St. Simons Island, Georgia. He accompanied Captain Henry Lord Page King during the Civil War until King's death in battle on December 13, 1862, during the battle of Fredericksburg, Virginia. He later accompanied R. Cuyler "Tip" King until the end of the Civil War. Neptune Park on St. Simons Island is named after Small.
