= Jean Guillaume =

- Born: October 28, 1918 Fosses-la-Ville
- Died: February 9, 2001 (aged 82) Namur
- Occupation: Teacher, writer
- Language: French, Walloon
- Citizenship: Belgian
- Subject: Gérard de Nerval

Jean Guillaume (1918–2001) was a Belgian Jesuit priest, professor of French literature, and writer and poet working in the Walloon language.

== Life ==
=== Early life and education ===
Jean Guillaume was born to Lucien Guillaume (d. 1957) and Rosa Kaisin (d. 1962) on October 28, 1918. He was the sixth of seven children.^{:18-22} Born in a rural setting— his father a farmer and horse merchant— Guillaume often spoke with pride about his humble origins and of the particular territory of Entre-Sambre-et-Meuse. The Walloon language was spoken in his household growing up, but it was his maternal aunt who first introduced him to its poetry. His interest in Walloon poetry was reinforced by his discovery of a poem by Camille Delvigne in the newspaper Vers l'Avenir. After these experiences, he began studying Romance languages to "better know the dialects."

After studying Greek and Latin at the collège Saint Paul in Godinne-sur-Meuse, he became a Jesuit novice at Arlon in 1937. His Jesuit training was classical and traditional, including classical and Romance philology at the Facultés Universitaires Notre-Dame de la Paix in 1945, pedagogical experience at Collège Saint-Servais in Liège, followed by further study in Romance philology at the University of Liège in 1948, as well as studies in philosophy and theology in Leuven where he became a priest on August 15, 1951.^{:41} He received a doctorate in Romance philology at the Catholic University of Leuven in 1954 for his work on Charles van Lerberghe's Chanson d'Eve.

=== Teaching and writing ===
In 1955, Guillaume was named to the post of professor of French literature at the Facultés Universitaires Notre-Dame de la Paix in Namur, where he stayed until his death. However, Walloon literature interested him as well. His academic career and writing centred around two major themes: on one hand, Walloon poetry, and on the other, regarding French literature, the personality and works of the poet Gérard de Nerval.

==== Walloon poetry ====
In 1945, Guillaume was accepted as a member of the dialectal literary circle Lès Rèlîs Namurwès (Walloon for "The Namurois Chosen Ones"). In 1948, he received the cockade for the member who had made the most notable work in that year.

Between 1947 and 1951, Guillaume had already published four well-received collections of Walloon poetry: Djusqu' au solia (Until the Sun, 1947), Inte li vièspréye èt l' gnût (Between Vespers and Night, 1949), Grègnes d'awous' (Harvest in Barns, 1949), Aurzîye (Clay, 1951). The main themes that he explored in his poetry were, among others, "attention to humble people and, in particular, old age, the past, nostalgia and childhood memories, death, and the Earth."

He published critical editions of the great figures of Walloon literature (including Georges Willame, Michel Renard, and Franz Dewandelaer), and collaborated on the Lucien Léonard's 1969 Lexique namurois (Namurois Lexicon). In 1984, he published La poésie wallonne (Walloon Poetry), a series of profiles of Walloon poets who were dear to him, including Jules Claskin, Gabrielle Bernard, Willy Bal, Émile Gilliard, Louis Remacle, Georges Smal, and others. He was a friend of Arthur Masson, father of the unforgettable 'Toine Culot.' In 1989, he published Œuvres poétique wallonnes (Walloon Poetic Works). Near the end of his life, Guillaume put together several more poems which he sent to the journal "Cahiers Wallons" (Walloon Notebooks). They were compiled under the allusive title Pa-drî l's-urées (Behind the Cliffs) and published posthumously. Guillaume was doubtlessly the person most engaged in philological research on the Walloon language.

==== Gérard de Nerval ====
In a more academic realm, Guillaume devoted himself to the works of the poet Gérard de Nerval. Over 35 years of persistent work and numerous publications on specific elements of a difficult author and oeuvre, he became a leading thinker on the troubled poet, eventually being selected (along with Claude Pichois, Michel Brix and others) by Gallimard to prepare a critical edition of the complete works of Nerval for the prestigious Bibliothèque de la Pléiade. This work, published in three volumes, took nine years from 1984 to 1993. Nerval became like a travelling companion to him. Guillaume was a fairly private person, but wrote about his own life through his research into Nerval through his 1988 book Nerval, masques et visage (Nerval, masks and face) in the Namur University Press collection Etudes nervaliennes et romantiques (Nervalian and Romantic Studies).

== Works ==
=== Walloon poetry ===
- 1947: Djusqu'au solia
- 1948: Inte li vièspréye èt l' gnût
- 1949: Grègnes d'awous'
- 1951: Aurzîye
- 1984: La poésie wallonne
- 1989: Œuvres Poétiques Wallonnes
- 2001: Pa-drî l's uréyes (posthumous)

=== Gérard de Nerval ===
- Œuvres complètes de Gérard de Nerval, (3 vol.), La Pléaide, Paris, 1984 to 1993
- Nerval, Masques et visage, Namur, 1988

== Prizes and distinctions ==
- 1945: admitted to the Rèlîs Namurwès
- 1949: City of Liège Biennial Prize
- 1950: Prize of the Province of Brabant
- 1952: Government Prize

== See also ==
=== Bibliography ===
- Smal, Georges (September 1992). "Renouveau de la poésie wallonne dans l'œuvre du R.P. Jean Guillaume, S.J.-R.N." [Review of the Walloon Poetry in the Works of R.P. Jean Guillaume, S.J.-R.N.]. Les Cahiers wallons (55th year, no. 9): 133–152.

=== External links ===
- Ene pådje sol pere Guillaume (in Walloon)
