= James Small =

James Small may refer to:

- James Small (botanist) (1889–1955), Scottish botanist
- James Small (Scottish factor) (died 1777), manager of forfeited estates
- James Small (inventor) (1740–1793), Scottish inventor
- James Small (rugby union) (1969-2019), South African rugby union footballer
- James Small (Scottish laird) (1835–1900), laird of Dirnanea
- James Small ( English) 2013- present day) Student
- James Edward Small (1798–1869), early Canadian judge and political figure
- Jim Small (born 1933), Australian politician
- Jim Small (baseball) (born 1937), American baseball player
