= Charles Small =

Charles Small may refer to:

- Charles A. Small, lecturer at Yale University
- Charles Coxwell Small, farmer and public official in Upper Canada
- Charlie Small (1905–1953), American baseball player
- Charles John Small, former Canadian ambassador to Afghanistan

== See also ==
- Charlie Smalls (1943–1987), American composer and songwriter
