= Georges Smal =

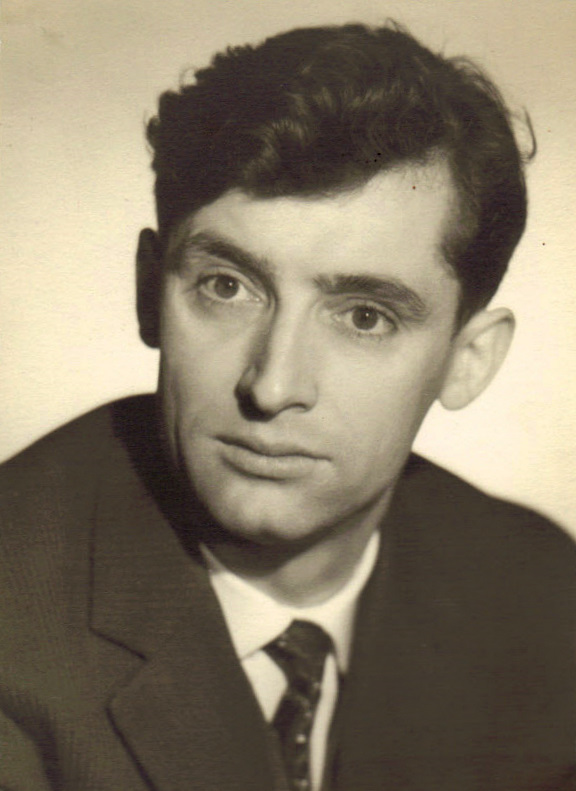
- Born: 8 January 1928; Houyet, Belgium
- Died: 1988 (aged 59–60); Namur, Belgium
- Occupation: writer

Georges Smal (1928–1988) was a Belgian writer who wrote mainly in the Walloon language. He was born in Houyet and died at Namur. He worked with Hubert Haas and Jean Guillaume, among many others.
