= Smalls (surname) =

Smalls is a surname. Notable people with the surname include:

- Alexander Smalls (born 1952), American restaurateur
- Bertie Smalls (1935–2008), British supergrass
- Biggie Smalls, former name of The Notorious B.I.G.
- Charlie Smalls (1943–1987), composer and songwriter
- Chris Smalls (born 1988), American labor organizer
- Cliff Smalls (1918–2008), American jazz trombonist, pianist, conductor and arranger
- Fred Smalls (born 1963), American football linebacker
- Joan Smalls (born 1988), Puerto Rican fashion model
- Marlena Smalls, American educator and musician
- Robert Smalls (1839–1915), South Carolina politician and former slave
- Tiger Smalls (born 1969), American boxing trainer
- Tionna T. Smalls (born 1984), American author and media personality
- Tommy Smalls (1926–1972), New York radio disc jockey known as "Dr. Jive"

Fictional characters:

- Derek Smalls, bassist in the parody heavy metal band Spinal Tap
- Leonard Smalls, Lone Biker of the Apocalypse in Raising Arizona
- Scotty "You're killin' me" Smalls, fifth-grade protagonist in The Sandlot
- Detective Smalls, a character from the movie Ruby, played by John Roselius
