= Smallbone =

Smallbone is a surname. Notable people with the surname include:

- Frederick Smallbone (born 1948), British rower
- Joel Smallbone (born 1984), Australian singer and actor

- with his brother Luke (born 1986) in For King & Country

- Rebecca Smallbone (born 1977), became Rebecca St. James, older sister of For King & Country duet
- Will Smallbone (born 2000), English-born, Irish international footballer

== Other uses ==
- Smallbone Deceased, a mystery novel by Michael Gilbert
- Smallbone Park, a cricket ground in Rotorua, New Zealand

== See also ==
- Robert Smallbones (1884-1976), British diplomat
