= Bill Small =

Irish hurler

Personal information
- Native name: Liam Ó Caoilte (Irish)
- Born: 9 May 1897 Borrisoleigh, County Tipperary, Ireland
- Died: 16 February 1962 (aged 64) Thurles, County Tipperary, Ireland
- Occupation: Secondary school teacher

Sport
- Sport: Hurling
- Position: Full-back
Club
- Years: Club
- Borrisoleigh
Inter-county
- Years: County
- 1923–1924 1927-1929: Dublin; Tipperary
Inter-county titles
- Leinster titles: 1
- All-Irelands: 1
- NHL: 1

William Small (9 May 1897 – 16 February 1962) was an Irish hurler. Usually lining out as a full-back, he was a member of the Dublin team that won the 1924 All-Ireland Championship.

After being selected for the Dublin senior team in 1923, Small was a regular member of the team for the subsequent two seasons. He won his only Leinster medal in 1924 before later winning his only All-Ireland medal after Dublin's defeat of Galway in the final. Small won a National Hurling League medal with Tipperary in 1928.

A secondary school teacher at Nenagh CBS, Small died on 16 February 1962.

== Honours ==
Dublin

- All-Ireland Senior Hurling Championship (1): 1924
- Leinster Senior Hurling Championship (1): 1924

Tipperary

- National Hurling League (1): 1927-28
