= Catt Small =

Catt Small is an African American product designer, game developer, web developer, and community organizer. She is known for her efforts in enhancing diversity within the tech and gaming industries and for mentoring upcoming developers.

== Early life and education ==
Catherine Small was born and raised in The Bronx, New York. Small learned how to code around the age of 10. At the age of 15, while attending LaGuardia High School, she started an apprenticeship at an all girls marketing firm called 3iYing. While at 3iYing, Small would go on to study and further develop her skills in web design and marketing.

Upon graduating high school, Catt Small attended the School of Visual Arts, where she earned a BFA in Graphic Design in 2011. Then in 2016, Small earned a master's degree in Integrated Digital Media from the New York University Tandon School of Engineering.

== Career ==
While attending New York University, Catt Small was awarded a Generation Google Scholarship. Just a few weeks after earning her master's degree, the inaugural Brooklyn Innovation Awards recognized her for her efforts to bring more women and people of color into the gaming world, and later named her Technologist of the Year. In 2016, Small alongside fellow game developer Chris Algoo, co-founded the Game Devs of Color Expo to increase diversity and celebrate the contributions of people of color within and behind the gaming industry.

In 2019, Catt Small released a decision-based game called SweetXheart. The game follows the life of a young Black woman and explores themes such as microaggressions, race, and gender. SweetXheart was recognized for its unique approach to raising awareness about the challenges faced by women of color.

After graduating from the School of Visual Arts, she was recruited for a full-time position in coding and web design at NASDAQ. She has also worked as a product designer at Etsy, and contributed to creating features for the SoundCloud app. Catt Small is working as a staff product designer at Dropbox, as the executive director of the Game Devs of Color Expo, and offers mentorship sessions to junior tech developers.

In September 2025, Small accepted a mayoral certificate of recognition on behalf of Game Devs of Color, marking the organization's tenth anniversary and its contributions to New York City's digital games community.
