= Rena Small =

American conceptual artist

Rena Small (born 1954) is an American conceptual artist who works primarily in photography, selective painting and Language Art components. Small is best known for her ongoing series the Artists' Hands Grid Continuum, https://www.artforum.com/picks/rena-small-4581, consisting of mostly black and white photographs, some with selective hand-painted details and 21st Century Color Ink Jet images, of the hands of prominent 20th and early 21st American artists. She began the project in 1984. The project is a life work and will end when Small's life does too. "Artists' Hands highlights portraits of hands, not faces, as another reservoir of personal expression. I choose artists who have accomplished strong bodies of work over a period of decades. To me, hands are a study of the human soul reflected in the mirror of my camera." Rena Small 2023 https://renasmall.com

== Collections ==
- Laguna Art Museum
- George Eastman Museum
- J. Paul Getty Museum
- Los Angeles County Museum of Art
- Norton Simon Museum
- Princeton University Art Museum
- RISD Museum
- Seattle Art Museum
