= Joe Small (entertainer) =

Joe Small (born 1830) was a New Zealand goldminer, entertainer and songwriter. He was born in London, England in about 1830. He toured with Charles Robert Thatcher.
