= Mary J. Small =

American reverend (1850–1945)

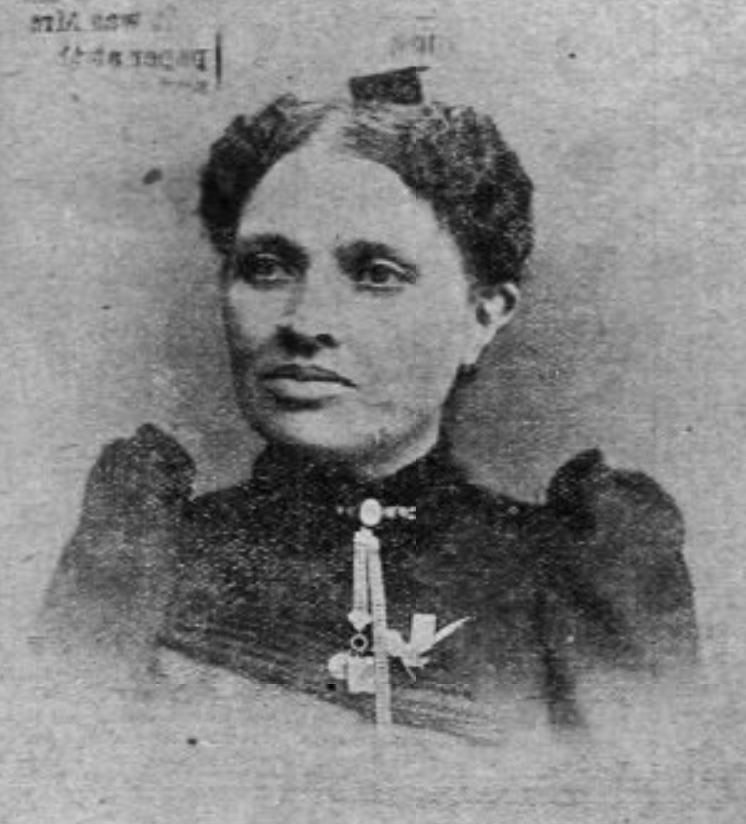
- Born: Mary J. Blair; October 20, 1850; Murphy's Boro, Tennessee
- Died: September 11, 1945 (aged 94); McKeesport, Pennsylvania
- Occupations: Minister and elder of the AME Zion Church
- Known for: First woman to achieve the position of elder in the AME Zion Church

Mary J. Small (1850–1945) was a reverend in the African Methodist Episcopal Zion Church (A.M.E. Zion Church), and was the first woman to achieve the position of elder.

== Early life ==
Mary J. Small was born on October 20, 1850, in Murphy's Boro, Tennessee, to mother Agnes Blair. Little is known of her childhood years or her father. In 1873, she married Reverend John Small, a well-known bishop in the A.M.E. Zion Church.

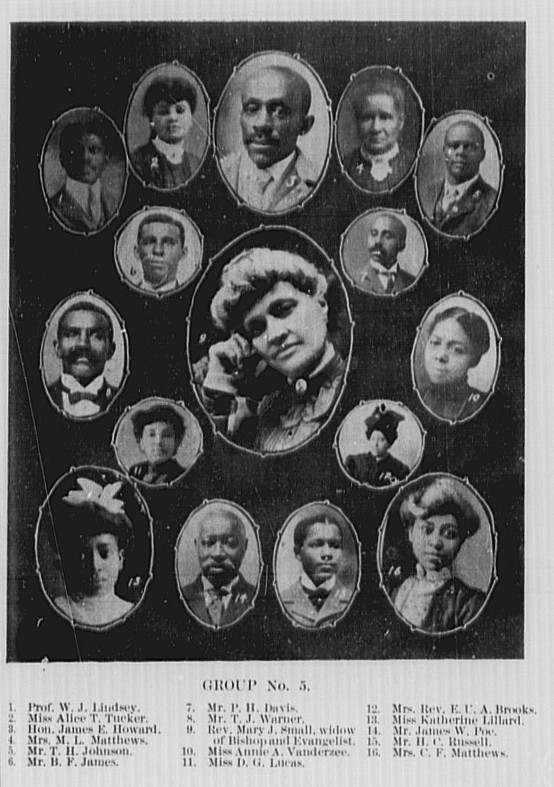
Reverend Mary J. Small is pictured, the first woman to be ordained an Elder in the A.M.E. Zion Church.

== Pastoral career ==
Initially, Small was opposed to female preachers. She resisted the call to preach until January 21, 1892, when she was licensed to preach by Dr. John E. Price. On May 19, 1985, Small was ordained as a deacon by Bishop A. Walters. Although she was active in Evangelical societies, no evidence shows Mary J. Small to have pastored a church. However, Small contributed much to her church community. Throughout her career, Small worked in the A.M.E. Zion church, serving on the Temperance and Women's Home and Foreign Missions committees. She was also president of the A.M.E. Zion church's Women's Society.

Small worked alongside her husband in the A.M.E. Zion Church, including as a missionary in Africa, until his death in 1905. In the United States, they conducted parish work together in Washington, D.C., North Carolina, Connecticut, and other states. She also the first woman to be ordained an elder, the highest holy order of the time, when her nomination was approved on May 23, 1898, at the Philadelphia and Baltimore connections of the Church. She was nominated after passing an examination, and although a number of ministers protested and requested a hearing, she was elected to the position of elder by a vote of 24 to 13. The A.M.E. Zion Church was the first to open this high-level position to women. As an elder, Small had the same rights as a minister, including authority over male members of the church.

Her social influence was also great, as seen in the Mary J. Small Social Club. It was a women's club that met monthly, and included activities such as music and reading.

== Death ==
She died on September 11, 1945, at age 94, in McKeesport, Pennsylvania. Funeral services were held at the Small Memorial A.M.E. Zion Church, and she was buried in the Lebanon Cemetery at York.
