= List of Scots =

Flag of Scotland

This is a list of notable people from Scotland.

== Architects and master masons ==
- James Adam (1732–1794), son of William Adam
- John Adam (1721–1792), eldest son of William Adam
- Robert Adam (1728–1792), architect, son of William Adam
- William Adam (1689–1748), father of James, John and Robert; architect and mason
- James Alison (1862–1932), architect responsible for the appearance of late Victorian Hawick
- John Macvicar Anderson (1835–1915)
- Robert Rowand Anderson (1834–1921)
- George Ashdown Audsley (1838–1925), architect, artist, illustrator, writer, and pipe organ designer
- William James Audsley (1833–1907)
- Ormrod Maxwell Ayrton (1874–1960), FRIBA
- John Baird (1798–1859), influential figure in the development of Glasgow Georgian and Victorian Architecture
- Andrew Balfour (1863–1943), architect, work including Holmlea Primary School, Glasgow
- Isobel Hogg Kerr Beattie (1900–1970), possibly the first woman to practise architecture in Scotland
- John Begg (1866–1937), architect who practised in London, South Africa and India, and taught at Edinburgh College of Art
- William Bryce Binnie (c. 1885–c. 1963)
- Alexander Black (c.1790–1858)
- Hippolyte Blanc (1844–1917)
- Thomas Bonnar (c.1770–1847), interior designer and architect
- James MacLellan Brown (c. 1886–1967), city architect of Dundee, designer of the Mills Observatory
- Thomas Brown (1781–1850), architect, works including Bellevue Church, Edinburgh
- Thomas Brown (1806–1872), architect notable for prison design
- Sir George Washington Browne (1853–1939)
- Sir William Bruce (c. 1630–1710)
- David Bryce (1803–1876)
- William Burn (1789–1870)
- John Burnet (1814–1901), architect who lived and practised in Glasgow
- Sir John James Burnet (1857–1938), Edwardian architect, son of John Burnet
- James Burton (1761–1837), famous London property developer and architect; father of Decimus Burton and James Burton (Egyptologist)
- James Byres of Tonley (1733–1817), architect, antiquary and dealer in Old Master paintings and antiquities
- Edward Calvert (c. 1847–1914)
- Charles Cameron (1743–1812)
- Alexander Buchanan Campbell (1914–2007)
- Alexander Lorne Campbell (1871–1944), architect founder of Scott & Campbell
- Colen Campbell (1676–1729)
- Colin Robert Vaughan Campbell, 7th Earl Cawdor (born 1962)
- John Campbell (1857–1942)
- John Chesser (1819–1892), architect largely based in Edinburgh
- Sir John Ninian Comper (1864–1960), Gothic Revival architect
- George Corson (1829–1910)
- David Cousin (1809–1878), architect, landscape architect and planner
- James Craig (1739–1795)
- James Hoey Craigie (1870–1930)
- Alexander Hunter Crawford (1865–1945), architect and businessman, owner of Crawford's Biscuits
- Alexander Davidson (1839–1908), architect active in Australia
- William Gordon Dey (1911–1997), architect who specialised in college buildings
- John Douglas of Pinkerton (c.1709–1778), architect who designed and reformed several country houses
- Sir Robert Drummond of Carnock (died 1592), Master of Work to the Crown of Scotland
- Sir James Duncan Dunbar-Nasmith, (1927–2023), leading conservation architect
- Alan Dunlop (born 1958)
- John Murray Easton (1889–1975), architect, winner of the Royal Gold Medal for architecture
- Alexander Edward (1651–1708), Episcopalian clergyman, draughtsman, architect and landscape designer
- Archibald Elliot (1760–1823)
- Reginald Francis Joseph Fairlie (1883–1952), architect of the National Library of Scotland
- James Fergusson (1808–1886)
- Claude Waterlow Ferrier (1879–1935), architect, specialising in the Art Deco style
- James Leslie Findlay (1868–1952)
- Kathryn Findlay (1953–2014)
- Robert Findlay (1859–1951)
- George Topham Forrest (1872–1945)
- William Fowler (1824–1906), architect
- Malcolm Fraser (born 1959)
- Patrick Allan Fraser (1812–1890), architect and painter
- Andrew Frazer (died 1792)
- Thomas Gildard (died 1895), architect of Britannia Music Hall
- James Gibbs (1682–1754)
- Charles Lovett Gill (1880–1960)
- James Gowan (1923–2015), postmodernist architect of the "engineering style"
- Sir James Gowans (1821–1890), maverick Edinburgh architect and builder
- James Gillespie Graham (1776–1855)
- John Edgar Gregan (1813–1855)
- David Hamilton (1768–1843)
- Sir James Hamilton of Finnart (c. 1495–1540), Master of Work to the Crown of Scotland
- Thomas Hamilton (1784–1858)
- John Henderson (1804–1862), architect chiefly remembered as a church architect
- James Macintyre Henry (1852–1929)
- William Hastie (1753/1763–1832)
- Gareth Hoskins (1967–2016), architect, UK Architect of the year 2006
- Edith Mary Wardlaw Burnet Hughes (1888–1971), considered Britain's first practising woman architect, who established her own firm in 1920
- Robert Hurd (1905-1963)
- Ernest Auldjo Jamieson (1880–1937), architect specialising in country houses, largely for wealthy family friends
- George Meikle Kemp (1795–1844), carpenter, draughtsman, and architect, best known as the designer of the Scott Monument
- Robert Kerr (1823–1904), co-founder of the Architectural Association
- Sir William Hardie Kininmonth (1904–1988), architect whose work mixed a modern style with Scottish vernacular
- Alexander Laing (1752–1823), architect
- William Leiper (1839–1916)
- David Lennox (1788–1873), bridge-builder and master stonemason, working in Australia
- John Lessels (1809–1883)
- Ian G Lindsay (1906–1966)
- Robert Lorimer (1864–1929)
- David MacGibbon (1831–1902)
- Kate Macintosh (born 1937), architect of Dawson's Heights in Southwark
- Alexander George Robertson Mackenzie (1879–1963), architect, in London and Aberdeen
- Alexander Marshall Mackenzie (1848–1933)
- Charles Rennie Mackintosh (1868–1928), architect, designer and watercolourist; husband and business partner of Margaret McDonald
- James Marjoribanks MacLaren (1853–1890), associated with the Arts and Crafts movement and Scottish Vernacular architecture
- Thomas MacLaren (1863–1928), architect who worked in worked in London, and the United States
- Andy MacMillan (1928–2014), architect, educator, writer and broadcaster
- Ebenezer James MacRae (1881–1951), City Architect for Edinburgh
- Thomas P. Marwick (1854–1927), architect based in Edinburgh, important to the architectural character of Marchmont
- Robert Matheson (1808–1877), architect and Clerk of Works for Scotland
- Robert Matthew (1906–1975)
- John McAslan, CBE (born 1954), designed many buildings around the world, such as the new departures concourse at London King's Cross railway station, the Iron Market in Port-au-Prince and the Olympia Park in Moscow
- Alexander McGill (died 1734), mason and architect, who worked in partnership with James Smith
- James Mckissack (1875–1940), cinema architect
- John McLachlan (1843–1893), architect
- George McRae (1858–1923), architect who migrated to Australia and pursued his career in Sydney
- Sir Frank Charles Mears (1880–1953)
- Adam Menelaws (born between 1748 and 1756–1831)
- James Miller (1860–1947)
- Sydney Mitchell (1856–1930)
- Robert Morham (1839–1912), City Architect for Edinburgh
- Richard Murphy (born 1955), architect, winner of the 2016 RIBA House of the year
- Gordon Murray (born 1954)
- Sir James Murray of Kilbaberton (died 1634), master wright and architect
- John Mylne (died 1621), master mason
- John Mylne of Perth (c. 1585–1657), master mason
- John Mylne (1611–1667), master mason and architect
- Robert Mylne (1633–1710), stonemason and architect, last Master Mason to the Crown of Scotland
- Robert Mylne (1733–1811), architect and civil engineer, remembered for Blackfriars Bridge, London
- Walter Newall (1780–1863)
- Peter Nicholson (1765–1844)
- John Paterson (died 1832)
- Robert Hamilton Paterson (1843–1911), partner in the architectural practice, Hamilton-Paterson and Rhind
- David Paton (1801–1882), architect and builder, who worked in the United States in the 1830s
- John Dick Peddie (1824–1891)
- John More Dick Peddie (1853–1921)
- Frederick Thomas Pilkington (1832–1898)
- James Playfair (1755–1794), father of William Henry
- William Henry Playfair (1790–1857)
- B. Marcus Priteca (1889–1971)
- Alan Reiach (1910-1992)
- Robert Reid Raeburn (1819–1888), architect who worked in and around Edinburgh
- Robert Reid (1774–1856), King's architect and surveyor for Scotland
- David Rhind (1808–1883)
- James Robert Rhind (1854–1918)
- John Rhind (1836–1889), architect from Inverness
- George Richardson (c. 1737–c. 1813), architectural and decorative draftsman
- John Thomas Rochead (1814–1878)
- Thomas Ross (1839–1930)
- Fred Rowntree (1860–1927), Arts and Crafts architect
- Witold Rybczynski (born 1943)
- James Salmon (1873–1924), grandson of James Salmon (1805–1888)
- James Salmon (1805–1888), grandfather of James Salmon (1873–1924)
- William Schaw (c. 1550–1602), Master of Works to James VI of Scotland for building castles and palaces
- John Scrimgeour of Myres (fl. 16th century), Master of Work for royal buildings for James V and Mary, Queen of Scots
- James Robb Scott (1882–1965), chief architect of the Southern Railway
- James Sellars (1843–1888)
- Richard Norman Shaw (1831–1912), architect known for his country houses and for commercial buildings
- Archibald Simpson (1790–1847), one of the major architects of Aberdeen
- James Smith (c. 1645–1731)
- James Smith of Jordanhill (1782–1867), architect, merchant, antiquarian, geologist, biblical critic and man of letters
- John Smith (1781–1852), first official city architect of Aberdeen
- Robert Smith (1722–1777), emigrant to America
- William Smith (1817–1891)
- John Soutar (1881–1951)
- James Souttar (1840–1922), worked in Sweden
- Basil Spence (1907–1976)
- John James Stevenson (1831–1908)
- James Stirling (1926–1992)
- John Tait (1787–1856), architect based in Edinburgh
- Thomas S. Tait (1882–1954)
- Bruce James Talbert (1838–1881), architect and interior designer
- Sir Andrew Thomas Taylor (1850–1937), architect and Conservative Party municipal councillor
- Alexander "Greek" Thomson (1817–1875)
- Leslie Grahame Thomson (1896-1974)
- James Thomson (died 1927), City Engineer, City Architect, and Housing Director of Dundee
- Ramsay Traquair, architect and academic with strong links to Canada
- James Campbell Walker (1821–1888), architect specialising in poorhouses and schools
- William Wallace (died 1631)
- Frederick Walters (1849–1931), notable for Roman Catholic churches
- George Henry Walton (1867–1933)
- Thomas Lennox Watson (c. 1850–1920)
- William Weir (1865–1950)
- Charles Wilson (1810–1863)
- Robert Wilson (1834–1901), architect for the Edinburgh Board of Education
- George Wittet (1878–1926), architect working mostly in Bombay, India
- William Young (1843–1900), designer of Glasgow City Chambers

== Businesspersons ==
- Robert Aitken (1734–1802), Philadelphia printer, the first to publish an English language Bible in the United States
- Alexander Aikman (1755–1838), Jamaican printer, newspaper publisher, and landowner.
- Arthur Anderson (1792–1868), co-founder of P&O
- Alexander Arbuthnot (died 1585), printer, work including George Buchanan's first History of Scotland
- Sir George Gough Arbuthnot (1848–1929), businessman and civic leader in British India
- John Bartholomew, Sr. (1805–1861), cartographer and engraver, founder of John Bartholomew and Son Ltd
- John Bartholomew Jr. (1831–1893), cartographer
- John Christopher Bartholomew (1923–2008), cartographer and geographer
- John George Bartholomew (1860–1920), cartographer and geographer
- Ian Bartholomew (1890–1962), cartographer and geographer
- William Beardmore, 1st Baron Invernairn (1856–1936), founder of William Beardmore & Company engineers and shipbuilders
- James Gordon Bennett, Sr. (1795–1872), founder and publisher of the New York Herald
- Alexander Berry (1781–1873), town of Berry is named after him, possibly the first millionaire in Australia
- David Berry (1795–1889), livestock breeder, landowner and benefactor; brother of Alexander Berry
- John Broadwood (1732–1812), founder of the piano manufacturer Broadwood and Sons
- Peter Buchan (1790–1854), editor, publisher, and collector of ballads and folktales
- David Buick (1854–1929), founded the Buick car company
- Sir George Burns, 1st Baronet (1795–1890), shipping magnate
- Sir James Burns (1846–1923), businessman, shipowner and philanthropist in Australia
- James Burns (1789–1871), shipowner born in Glasgow
- John Burns, 1st Baron Inverclyde (1829–1901), shipowner, chairman of Cunard
- Agnes Campbell, Lady Roseburn (1637–1716), printer, described as "Scotland's wealthiest early modern printer".
- Andrew Carnegie (1835–1919), steel magnate, major philanthropist
- Thomas Catto, 1st Baron Catto (1879–1959), businessman, Governor of the Bank of England.
- William Chambers of Glenormiston (1800–1883), publisher
- Sir Arnold Clark (1928–2017), founder of Arnold Clark Automobiles
- Catherine Cranston (1849–1934), leading figure in the development of tea rooms, patron of Charles Rennie Mackintosh and others
- William Cunninghame of Lainshaw (1731–1799), tobacco merchant
- David Dale (1739–1806), merchant and businessman, established the weaving community of New Lanark
- William Davidson (1740–1890), entrepreneur and founder of the first colony in New Brunswick, Canada
- Adam Dawson (1793–1873), Linlithgow and owner of St Magdalene distillery
- George Dempster of Dunnichen and Skibo (1732–1818), advocate, landowner, agricultural improver, politician and business man
- Peter Denny (1821–1895), shipbuilder and shipowner, with William Denny & Brothers
- John Dewar, Sr. (1805–1880), founder of John Dewar & Sons, Scotch whisky distillers
- Dr. Henry Duncan (1774–1846), Church of Scotland Minister; started the world's first savings bank in Ruthwell, Dumfries and Galloway
- John Elder (1824–1869), marine engineer and shipbuilder
- Sir Tom Farmer (born 1940), entrepreneur
- Robert Fleming (1845–1933), financier, founder of Robert Fleming & Co merchant bank
- Bertie Forbes (1880–1954), founder of Forbes magazine
- Alexander Fordyce (died 1789), banker, involved in the bank run on Neal, James, Fordyce and Down in 1772
- Sir Alexander Fraser (c.1537-1623), founder of Fraserburgh
- Hugh Fraser (1817–1853), founder of House of Fraser
- Anita Margaret Frew (born 1957), businessperson
- Martin Gilbert (born 1955), Chief Executive of Aberdeen Asset Management
- James Gillespie (1726–1797), snuff-maker and philanthropist
- Ann Gloag (born 1942), co-founder of Stagecoach Group, born in Perth
- Thomas Blake Glover (1838–1911), Nagasaki-based trader in 19th-century Japan
- Robert Gordon (1668–1731), founder of the Robert Gordon University
- Sir Angus Grossart (1937–2022), chairman of merchant bank Noble Grossart
- Andrew Halyburton (died 1507), merchant, 'Conservator of the Scottish privileges in the Low Countries'
- Willie Haughey (born 1956), entrepreneur and founder of City Refrigeration Holdings
- George Heriot (1563–1624), goldsmith and founder of George Heriot's School
- Tom Hunter (born 1961), entrepreneur and philanthropist, founder of Sports Division
- John Lawson Johnston (1839–1900), creator of Bovril
- Irvine Laidlaw (born 1942), Scotland's 6th richest man and founder of the modern conference company
- John Law (1671–1729), advocate of paper money and founder of the Mississippi Company
- Sir Thomas Lipton (1848–1931), founder of Lipton's Tea
- Sir George Mathewson, (born 1940), former chairman of the Royal Bank of Scotland
- Jim McColl (born 1951), founder of Clyde Blowers
- William McEwan (1827–1913), founder of McEwans brewers
- Stewart Milne (born 1950), founder of Stewart Milne Group and majority shareholder of Aberdeen F.C.
- Michelle Mone (born 1971), founder of Ultimo
- Sir David Murray (born 1951), founder of Murray International Metals
- Thomas Napier (1802–1881), builder, emigrant to Australia
- William Paterson (1658–1719), founder of Bank of Scotland and Bank of England
- Alexander Cameron Sim (1840–1900), pharmacist and entrepreneur active in Japan, founder of the Kobe Regatta & Athletic Club
- Robert Smith, Baron Smith of Kelvin (born 1944), Chair of the Green Investment Bank
- Brian Souter (born 1954), entrepreneur and co-founder of Stagecoach Group
- James Stirling (1800–1876), builder of steam locomotives, brother of Robert Stirling
- Thomas Sutherland (1834–1922), founder of HSBC
- David Couper Thomson (1861–1954), proprietor of the newspaper and publishing company DC Thomson
- George Thomson (1815–1866), marine engineer and shipbuilder
- William Walls (1819–1893), lawyer and industrialist, influenced the development of 19th-century Glasgow
- William Douglas Weir, 1st Viscount Weir (1877–1959), industrialist, engineer and politician
- George Watson (1654–1723), first chief accountant of the Bank of Scotland; founder of George Watson's College
- Wilson, Sons, founded in 1837 by Edward and Fleetwood Pellow Wilson; one of South America's largest shipping brokers
- Andrew Yule (1834–1902), businessman who founded Andrew Yule and Company in India
- Sir David Yule, 1st Baronet (1858–1928), businessman based in India
- George Yule (1829–1892), merchant in England and India, fourth President of the Indian National Congress

== Composers ==
- Euphemia Allen (1861–1948), composer of the famous Chopsticks (waltz)
- Robert Burns (1759–1796)
- Robert Carver (c. 1485–c. 1570)
- Ronald Center (1913–1973)
- Erik Chisholm (1904–1965)
- James Clapperton (born 1968)
- John Clerk of Penicuik (1676–1755)
- James Dillon (born 1950)
- Thomas Erskine, 6th Earl of Kellie (1732–1781)
- Iain Hamilton (1922–2000)
- Tobias Hume (c.1579–1645)
- Hamish MacCunn (1868–1916)
- John Blackwood McEwen (1868–1948)
- Edward McGuire (born 1948)
- Alexander Mackenzie (1847–1935)
- Charles Macintosh (1839–1922), composer, performer and naturalist
- Robert Mackintosh (c.1745–1807)
- James MacMillan (born 1959)
- Stuart MacRae (born 1976)
- William Marshall (1748–1833)
- John McLeod (1934–2022)
- Gordon McPherson (born 1965)
- Stuart Mitchell (born 1965)
- Thea Musgrave (born 1928)
- James Oswald (1710–1769)
- Morris Pert (1947–2010)
- Francis George Scott (1880–1958)
- James Scott Skinner (1843–1927), composer, dancing master, and fiddler
- Robert Archibald Smith (1780–1829), composer known for his collection Scotish Minstrel
- Ronald Stevenson (1928–2015)
- William Sweeney (born 1950)
- Julian Wagstaff (born 1970)
- William Wallace (1860–1940)
- Judith Weir (born 1954)
- Thomas Wilson (1927–2001)

== Criminals ==
- William Armstrong of Kinmont (Kinmont Willie) (fl. 16th century), border reiver
- Sawney Bean, semi-mythical head of a clan in 15th- or 16th-century Scotland, reportedly executed for mass murder and cannibalism
- Bible John, nickname of supposed serial killer
- Robert Black (born 1947), serial killer convicted of the kidnapping and murder of four girls
- Geordie Bourne (died 1597), border reiver
- Ian Brady (1938–2017), one of the Moors murderers
- Deacon Brodie (1741–1788), Edinburgh city councillor and burglar
- Michael Brown (born 1966), fraudster
- Henry John Burnett (1942–1963), murderer, last man to be hanged in Scotland
- Isla Bryson (born 1991), rapist who later transitioned
- Colonel Francis Charteris (c. 1675–1732), nicknamed "The Rape-Master General"
- Robert Crichton, 8th Lord Crichton of Sanquhar (died 1612), peer, executed for the murder of a fencing teacher, John Turner
- Williamina "Minnie" Dean (1844–1895), emigrant to New Zealand, found guilty of infanticide and hanged; the only woman to receive the death penalty in New Zealand
- Janet Douglas, Lady Glamis (c.1498–1537), noblewoman convicted of attempted murder, executed by burning
- William John Duff (born 1962), dentist convicted for fraud and reckless endangerment
- Paul John Ferris (born 1963), gangster and author
- Donald Forbes (1935–2008), murderer, convicted of two separate murders
- Arthur Furguson (1883–1938), con artist
- Jimmy Gauld (1931–2004), footballer and match fixing ringleader
- John Gow (c. 1698–1725), notorious pirate
- Sir Robert Graham of Kinpont (died 1437), assassin of James I of Scotland
- Sir Archibald Grant 2nd Baronet (1696–1778), fraudster, expelled from parliament, and agricultural improver
- David Haggart (1801–1821), thief and murderer
- Archibald Hall (a.k.a. Roy Fontaine) (1924–2002), serial killer and thief
- James Hamilton of Bothwellhaugh and Woodhouselee (died 1581) assassin of James Stewart, 1st Earl of Moray, Regent of Scotland
- Thomas Watt Hamilton (1952–1996), perpetrator of the Dunblane school massacre
- John the Painter (1752–1777), highwayman, burglar, shoplifter, robber, and rapist, who committed acts of terror in British naval dockyards in 1776–77
- William Kidd (1645–1701), mutineer and pirate
- Sonny Leitch (born c. 1933), career criminal and jailbreaker
- "Captain" James MacLaine (1724–1750), highwayman, known as the "Gentleman Highwayman"
- Jamie Macpherson (1675–1700), outlaw
- Peter Manuel (1927–1958), serial killer
- John Maxwell, 9th Lord Maxwell (c. 1583–1613), Catholic nobleman, murderer of the Laird of Johnstone
- Edith McAlinden (born 1968), murderer, guilty of triple murder in Glasgow
- Ian McAteer (born 1961), Glasgow gangster
- William McCoy (c. 1763 – 1798), sailor and a mutineer on board HMS Bounty
- Thomas McGraw (1952–2007), known as "The Licensee" or "Wan-Baw McGraw", gangster
- Frank McPhee (1948–2000), Glasgow gangland boss
- Patrick Meehan (1927–1994), safe blower, convicted of murder but given a royal pardon
- Anthony Joseph Miller (1941–1960), the last teenager to be executed in the United Kingdom
- Robert Mone (born 1948), convicted murderer
- James Morrison (1760–1807) seaman and mutineer who took part in the Mutiny on the Bounty
- Susan Newell (1893–1923), murderer, the last woman to be hanged in Scotland
- Dennis Nilsen (born 1945), serial killer
- Colin Norris (born 1976), nurse convicted of murdering four elderly patients in a hospital in Leeds
- Dora Noyce (1900–1977), Edinburgh brothel keeper
- Johnny Ramensky (1905–1972), career criminal who used his safe-cracking abilities as a commando during World War II
- Robert Sempill, 3rd Lord Sempill (c. 1505–1576), lord of Parliament, murderer
- Robert Stewart, Master of Atholl (died 1437), assassin of James I of Scotland
- Walter Stewart, Earl of Atholl (died 1437), assassin of James I of Scotland
- Arthur Thompson (1931–1993), Glasgow gangster
- Peter Tobin (born 1946), convicted serial killer and sex offender
- Andrew Walker (1954–2021), army corporal who killed three colleagues in a payroll robbery

== Economists ==
- Sir Kenneth Alexander (1922–2001), university administrator
- Adam Anderson (1692/1693–1765), economic historian
- Duncan Black (1908–1991), social choice theorist
- Sir Alexander Cairncross (1911–1998), founder of the UK Government Economic Service
- Frances Anne Cairncross (born 30 August 1944), economist, journalist and academic
- John Marcus Fleming (1911–1976), IMF deputy director of research
- David Greenaway (born 1952), university administrator
- John Law (c. 1671–1729), founder of Banque Générale in France
- James Loch (1780–1855), economist, advocate, barrister, estate commissioner and Member of Parliament
- Joseph Lowe (died 1831), journalist and political economist
- Ronald MacDonald (born 1955)
- Henry Dunning Macleod (1821–1902), credit theorist
- Ailsa McKay (1963–2014), feminist economist, Professor of Economics at Glasgow Caledonian University and United Nations adviser
- Sir James Mirrlees (1936–2018), Nobel Laureate
- Anton Muscatelli (born 1962), Principal and Vice-Chancellor of the University of Glasgow
- Brian Quinn (born 1936), former Deputy Governor of the Bank of England and Chairman of Celtic FC
- John Rae (1796–1872), polymath
- Gavin Clydesdale Reid (born 1946)
- Adam Smith (1723–1790), moral philosopher, author of The Wealth of Nations, the first modern work on economics

== Engineers and inventors ==
- James Abernethy (1814–1896), civil engineer
- Neil Arnott (1788–1874), physician and inventor of the Arnott waterbed
- Sir William Arrol (1839–1913), bridge builder
- Alexander Bain (1810–1877), inventor and engineer, first to invent and patent the electric clock and fax machine
- Charles Baird (1766–1843), engineer who played an important part in the industrial and business life of St. Petersburg
- Francis Baird (1802–1864), engineer in St. Petersburg; son of Charles Baird
- Hugh Baird (1770–1827), civil engineer, who designed and built the Union Canal
- John Logie Baird (1888–1946), television
- Nicol Hugh Baird (1796–1849), surveyor, engineer and inventor who emigrated to Canada
- Alexander Graham Bell (1847–1922), telephone, National Geographic Society, hydrofoil
- Henry Bell (1767–1830), ran Europe's first commercially successful steamboat
- Rev Patrick Bell (1799–1869), Church of Scotland minister, and inventor of the reaping machine
- George Bennie (1891–1957), the Bennie Railplane
- Sir James Black (1924–2010), beta-blockers
- Robert Blair (1748–1828), aplanatic telescope
- Benjamin Blyth (1819–1866), civil engineer
- Benjamin Blyth II (1849–1917), civil engineer
- Sir Thomas Bouch (1822–1880), railway engineer, designer of the original Tay Rail Bridge
- Robert Henry Bow (1827–1909), civil engineer and photographer
- James Braid (1795–1860), hypnosis
- James Bremner (1784–1856), naval architect, harbour builder and ship-raiser
- David Brewster (1781–1868), lenticular stereoscope
- George Brown (1650–1730), arithmetician and inventor
- Walter Brown (1886–1957), engineer and mathematician
- Sir George Bruce of Carnock (c.1550–1625), merchant and mining engineer
- Richard Henry Brunton (1841–1901), "father of Japanese lighthouses"
- Dorothy Donaldson Buchanan (1899–1985), civil engineer, first woman member of the Institution of Civil Engineers
- Duncan Cameron (1825–1901), inventor of the "Waverley" pen nib, owner of The Oban Times newspaper
- James Chalmers (1782–1853), adhesive postage stamp
- Sir Dugald Clark (a.k.a. Clerk) (1854–1932), first two stroke cycle engine (the Clark cycle)
- Archibald Cochrane, 9th Earl of Dundonald (1749–1831), made many general useful inventions, particularly in the navy
- Thomas Cochrane, 10th Earl of Dundonald (1775–1860), designed many inventions to do with naval technology and steam engines
- Dr James C. Crow (1789–1856), creator of the sour mash process for creating bourbon whiskey
- Robert Davidson (1804–1894), first electric locomotive
- James Dewar (1842–1923), inventor of the Thermos flask and co-developer of cordite
- William Dickson (1860–1935), motion picture camera and the world's first film
- Captain Thomas Drummond (1797–1840) army officer, civil engineer, and pioneer in use of the Drummond light
- Victoria Drummond (1894–1978), marine engineer, first woman member of Institute of Marine Engineering, Science and Technology
- John Boyd Dunlop (1840–1921), the modern rubber tyre
- Henry Dyer (1848–1918), engineer, contributor to Western-style technical education in Japan
- Sir Peter Fairbairn (1799–1861), engineer and inventor, and mayor of Leeds, West Yorkshire
- Sir William Fairbairn, 1st Baronet (of Ardwick) (1789–1874), civil engineer, structural engineer and shipbuilder
- Patrick Ferguson (1744–1780), the Ferguson rifle
- Sir Alexander Fleming (1881–1955), isolated penicillin from the fungus Penicillium notatum
- Sir Sandford Fleming, (1827–1915), engineer and inventor, who emigrated to Canada; he proposed worldwide standard time zones, and engineered much of the Intercolonial Railway and the Canadian Pacific Railway
- Alexander John Forsyth (1768–1843), Presbyterian clergyman who invented the percussion cap
- William George Nicholson Geddes (1913–1993), civil engineer
- David Gow (born 1957), inventor of the i-Limb prosthetic hand
- Thomas Lomar Gray (1850–1908), engineer noted for his pioneering work in seismology
- James Gregory (1638–1675), the Gregorian telescope
- Thomas Graeme Nelson Haldane (1897–1981), engineer
- William Handyside (1793–1850), engineer involved in important construction projects in St. Petersburg
- James Harrison (1816–1893), pioneer in mechanical refrigeration
- George Johnston (1855–1945), engineer, designer and constructor of Scotland's first automobile
- James Kennedy (1797–1886), locomotive and marine engineer
- David Kirkaldy (1820–1897), engineer, whose pioneering testing works now houses the Kirkaldy Testing Museum
- James Bowman Lindsay (1799–1862), inventor of the constant electric light bulb
- Charles Macintosh (1766–1843), patented waterproofing
- Kirkpatrick MacMillan (1813–1878), bicycle
- John Loudon McAdam (1756–1836), modern road construction
- Sir Robert McAlpine (Concrete Bob) (1847–1934), road builder
- Thomas McCall (1834–1904), cartwright, developer of the bicycle
- Andrew Meikle (1719–1811), mechanical engineer, inventor of the threshing machine
- Patrick Miller (1730–1815), steamboat pioneer
- Thomas Morton (1781–1832), shipwright and inventor of the patent slip
- William Murdoch (1754–1839), pioneer of gas lighting
- David Napier (1790–1869), marine engineer
- David Napier (1785–1873), engineer, founder of D. Napier & Son, an early precision engineering company which later made automobiles and aero engines
- James Robert Napier (1821–1879), engineer and inventor of Napier's diagram
- John Napier (1550–1617), Logarithm
- Robert Napier (1791–1876), marine engineer, "the father of Clyde Shipbuilding"
- Robert D. Napier (1821–1885), engineer
- James Nasmyth (1808–1890), steam hammer
- Robert Stirling Newall (1812–1889), engineer, improved wire rope and submarine cable laying
- James Newlands (1813–1871), civil engineer, Borough Engineer of Liverpool as Borough Engineer
- Murdoch Paterson (1826–1898), Inverness engineer and architect, chief engineer of the Highland Railway
- William Paterson (1658–1719), the Bank of England
- William John Macquorn Rankine (1820–1872), developed a complete theory of the steam engine and indeed of all heat engines
- John Rennie the Elder (1761–1821), engineer, designer of the "new" 19th-century London Bridge
- John Shepherd-Barron (1925–2010), inventor of the automatic teller machine
- Hugh Smellie (1840–1891), engineer, Locomotive Superintendent
- Thomas Smith (1752–1814), early lighthouse engineer
- Charles Spalding (1738–1783), Edinburgh confectioner and improver of the diving bell
- Alan Stevenson (1807–1865), lighthouse engineer
- Charles Alexander Stevenson (1855–1950), lighthouse engineer
- David Stevenson (1815–1886), lighthouse designer
- David Alan Stevenson (1854–1938), lighthouse engineer
- Robert Stevenson (1772–1850), civil engineer, designer and builder of lighthouses
- Thomas Stevenson (1818–1887), pioneering lighthouse designer and meteorologist; father of Robert Louis Stevenson
- Matthew Stirling (1856–1931), Locomotive Superintendent of the Hull and Barnsley Railway
- Patrick Stirling (1820–1895), railway engineer, and Locomotive Superintendent of the Great Northern Railway
- Reverend Dr Robert Stirling (1790–1878), clergyman, and inventor of the Stirling engine
- William Symington (1764–1831), engineer, built the first practical steam boat
- Thomas Telford (1757–1834), architect, civil engineer, bridge designer
- Robert William Thomson (1822–1873)
- Sir Robert Watson-Watt (1893–1973), developed radar
- James Watt (1736–1819), engineer, significantly improved the steam engine
- James Young (1811–1883), invented a way of extracting paraffin oil

== Explorers ==
- Albert Armitage (1864–1943), Royal Navy Captain who was part of the Jackson–Harmsworth Expedition, which explored Franz Josef Land and rescued Fridtjof Nansen and his men from certain death; later part of the Discovery Expedition in Antarctica
- John Arthur (1881–1952), British Army Captain and medical missionary for over thirty years in Kenya; known simply as Doctor Arthur to generations of Africans
- William Balfour Baikie (1824–1864), naturalist, philologist and surgeon on the 1854 Niger Expedition; explored the Benue River and helped open up Nigeria to British trade while supporting the abolition of the slave trade
- Peter Belches (1796–1890), Royal Navy Lieutenant who explored the Swan River and its surrounding area while aboard Admiral Sir James Stirling's HMS Success
- Alexander Berry (1781–1873), merchant and surgeon who established the first European settlement on the south coast of New South Wales
- Henry Robertson Bowers (1883–1912), Royal Navy Lieutenant who was part of the ill-fated Terra Nova Expedition, which attempted to be the first to reach the South Pole
- Robert Brown (1842–1895), scientist, explorer, and author
- James Bruce (1730–1794), traveller and travel writer who spent more than a dozen years in North Africa and then Ethiopia, where he traced the origins of the Blue Nile
- William Speirs Bruce (1867–1921), naturalist, oceanographer, polar scientist and leader of the Scottish National Antarctic Expedition; established the first permanent weather station there and became the first to widely explore the Weddell Sea
- David Buchan (1780–1838), Royal Navy Captain who conducted expeditions in Newfoundland and Labrador and Spitsbergen
- Sir Alexander Burnes (1805–1841), diplomat and explorer of Afghanistan
- Colin Campbell (1686–1757), entrepreneur, merchant and co-founder of the Swedish East India Company, the largest trading company in Sweden throughout the 18th century; King Frederick I of Sweden's ambassador to the Emperor of China
- Hugh Clapperton (1788–1827), Royal Navy Captain and traveller who explored many lakes and rivers in Africa; one of the first white people to see Lake Chad
- John Dundas Cochrane (1793–1825), Royal Navy Captain and traveller who crossed Eurasia on foot to reach the Kamchatka Peninsula
- William Cormack (1796–1868), agriculturalist, author and philanthropist; first European to explore the interior of Newfoundland and Labrador, while also building friendly relations with the native Beothuk people
- Robert Bontine Cunninghame Graham (1852–1936), Don Roberto, adventurer, journalist, politician and writer who carried out many activities in Argentina, Mexico, Morocco, Spain and the United States
- David Douglas (1799–1834), botanist and gardener who explored parts of the remote Scottish Highlands, as well as North America and Hawaii; second person to summit Mauna Loa volcano; introduced hundreds of plants to Great Britain, including the Douglas fir
- Douglas Douglas–Hamilton (1903–1973), Lord Clydesdale, aviator and the first to see Mount Everest from above while carrying out the first detailed scientific survey of the Himalayas, the extremities he endured also helped demonstrate the need for pressurised cabins inside aircraft
- Alexander Forbes (1778–1862), author and merchant; first British consul to Mexico; published one of the first accounts in English of California (then a province of Mexico)
- Henry Ogg Forbes (1851–1932), botanist and ornithologist in both the Maluku Islands and New Guinea; director of the Canterbury Museum in New Zealand for three years
- Simon Fraser (1776–1862), fur trader who was employed by the North West Company and charted much of what is now the Canadian province of British Columbia; built the area's first trading ports; explored the 854-mile Fraser River
- George Glas (1725–1765), adventurer, merchant and seaman who traded between Brazil, the Canary Islands and north-western Africa
- Sir Alexander Richard Glen (1912–2004), explorer of the Arctic, and wartime intelligence officer
- Robert Gordon (1580–1661), antiquary, cartographer, geographer, mathematician and poet who created and revised many maps, including the first atlas of Scotland after being asked via a letter from King Charles I of England
- James Augustus Grant (1827–1892), British Army Lieutenant who accompanied John Hanning Speke in the search and discovery of the source of the River Nile; the Grant's gazelle is named in his honour
- Sir James Hector (1834–1907), geologist, naturalist and surgeon on the Palliser Expedition, the main goal of which was to find possible routes for the Canadian Pacific Railway; went on to manage what is now the Royal Society of New Zealand for thirty-five years
- Isobel Wylie Hutchison (1889–1982), Arctic traveller and botanist
- Alexander Keith Johnston (1844–1879), cartographer and geographer to a commission for the survey of Paraguay; died while leading the Royal Geographical Society's expedition to Lake Malawi
- John Kirk (1832–1922), botanist, naturalist and physician; British administrator in Zanzibar; supported the abolition of the slave trade along with his associate David Livingstone
- Alexander Gordon Laing (1793–1826), British Army Major who was the first Westerner to discover the ancient city of Timbuktu
- Macgregor Laird (1808–1861), merchant and shipbuilder; pioneered British trade on the Niger River; his ship Sirius was the first to cross the Atlantic Ocean run entirely on steam power; supported the abolition of the slave trade
- William Lithgow (1582–1645), alleged spy, traveller and writer who claimed to have peregrinated over 35,000 miles throughout various parts of the world
- David Livingstone (1813–1873), medical missionary and one of Africa's most celebrated explorers; discovered Victoria Falls, among other things; strongly opposed the slave trade; his meeting with H. M. Stanley gave rise to the quotation "Dr. Livingstone, I presume?"
- Gregor MacGregor (1786–1845), adventurer, coloniser, land speculator and soldier who fought in South America during the Spanish American wars of independence, before later helping to colonise parts of the continent
- John MacGregor (1825–1892), artist, barrister, philanthropist and travel writer; descendant of Rob Roy MacGregor; developed canoe sailing and popularised canoeing as a recreational sport, paddling and sailing them in both Europe and the Middle East
- Alistair Mackay (1878–1914), doctor and polar explorer, one of the first expedition to reach the south magnetic pole
- Sir Alexander Mackenzie (1764–1820), merchant who traced the 1,080-mile Mackenzie River and completed the first east to west overland crossing of the Americas (north of Mexico) to reach the Pacific Ocean; this predated the Lewis and Clark Expedition by a decade
- Harry McNish (1874–1930), carpenter on Sir Ernest Shackleton's Imperial Trans–Antarctic Expedition; later responsible for much of the work that ensured the crew's survival after the ship was destroyed
- Archibald Menzies (1754–1852), botanist, naturalist and surgeon on the Vancouver Expedition, which circumnavigated the globe, touched five continents and changed the course of history for the American indigenous people and the continent's European colonisation
- Sir Thomas Mitchell (1792–1855), British Army Lieutenant Colonel and surveyor in south-eastern Australia who became the Surveyor General of New South Wales; led several expeditions along the Darling River and beyond
- John Muir (1838–1914), author and naturalist whose conservation and preservation activism led to the creation of many national parks in the United States; founded the Sierra Club in California, one of the most important conservation organisations in America
- Sir John Murray (1841–1914), pioneering limnologist, marine biologist and oceanographer who assisted Charles Wyville Thomson on the Challenger expedition; first to note the existence of oceanic trenches, as well as the Mid–Atlantic Ridge
- William Hutchison Murray (1913–1996), mountaineer and writer who helped discover a route through the ice fields of Khumbu Glacier to the South Col of Mount Everest's summit, later used by Sir Edmund Hillary and Sherpa Tenzing Norgay during their historic ascent
- Walter Oudney (1790–1824), physician and African explorer, one of the first Europeans to accomplish a north–south crossing of the Sahara Desert
- Mungo Park (1771–1806), botanist and surgeon who conducted many journeys to Africa and was the first Westerner to encounter the central portion of the Niger River
- William Paterson (1755–1810), botanist, British Army Colonel and lieutenant governor, best known for leading early settlement in Tasmania
- John Rae (1813–1893), physician who explored Northern Canada, mainly surveying parts of the Northwest Passage; later reported the fate of the lost Franklin Expedition
- Sir John Richardson (1787–1865), naturalist and naval surgeon; traveled with Sir John Franklin in search of the Northwest Passage on the Coppermine Expedition of 1819–1822; they later surveyed 1,878 miles of previously unmapped coast and made many natural history discoveries
- Sir James Clark Ross (1800–1862), Royal Navy Admiral who led the first successful expedition to reach the north magnetic pole; discovered the Ross Sea, Victoria Land, and volcanoes Mount Erebus and Mount Terror in Antarctica
- Sir John Ross (1777–1856), Royal Navy Admiral who discovered the Boothia Peninsula, the Gulf of Boothia and King William Island while exploring the Arctic
- John Ross (1817–1903), drover who explored deserts, mountain ranges and rivers in South Australia, before later leading an expedition to establish a route for the Australian Overland Telegraph Line
- Alexander Selkirk (1676–1721), sailor who spent four years as a castaway after being marooned on the Juan Fernández Islands off the coast of Chile; his story is the inspiration behind Daniel Defoe's well-known character and novel Robinson Crusoe
- Henry Sinclair (c. 1345–c. 1400), nobleman rumoured to have explored Greenland and North America one hundred years before Christopher Columbus
- Sir James Stirling (1791–1865), colonial administrator and Royal Navy Admiral who established the Swan River Colony and became the first Governor of Western Australia
- John McDouall Stuart (1815–1866), surveyor and one of Australia's most famous explorers; led the first expedition to successfully traverse the continent from south to north and return
- Sir Charles Wyville Thomson (1830–1882), marine zoologist, natural historian and the chief scientist on the pioneering Challenger Expedition, which lay the foundation for modern oceanography
- Joseph Thomson (1858–1895), geologist and an important figure in the Scramble for Africa; headed many expeditions, including taking over one following the death of Alexander Keith Johnston; the Thomson's gazelle is named in his honour
- Tom Weir (1914–2006), author, broadcaster and climber who is best known for his long-running television series, Weir's Way, which helped popularise hillwalking and the great outdoors
- Thomas Braidwood Wilson (c. 1792–1843), surgeon and explorer in Australia
- John Wood (1812–1871), cartographer, naval officer and surveyor who explored many Asian rivers and compiled several maps of South Asia, which remained standard for most of the 19th century
- Sir James Wordie (1889–1962), geologist, chief of scientific staff on Sir Ernest Shackleton's Imperial Trans–Antarctic Expedition

== Humorists ==
- Stanley Baxter (1926–2025)
- Danny Bhoy (born 1974)
- Frankie Boyle (born 1972)
- Rory Bremner (born 1961)
- Kevin Bridges (born 1986)
- Janet Brown (1924–2011)
- Fred Cairns (1857–1896)
- Susan Calman
- Rhona Cameron (born 1965)
- Stephen Carlin
- Des Clarke
- Alun Cochrane (born 1975)
- Billy Connolly (born 1942)
- Ronald Balfour Corbett (1930–2016), known better as Ronnie Corbett
- Ivor Cutler (1923–2006)
- Karen Dunbar (born 1971)
- Craig Ferguson (born 1962)
- Gregor Fisher (born 1953), known better as the character Rab C. Nesbitt
- Rikki Fulton (1924–2004)
- George Gale (1929–2003), political cartoonist
- Graeme Garden (born 1943)
- Janey Godley (1961–2024)
- Greg Hemphill (born 1969)
- Craig Hill
- Armando Iannucci (born 1963)
- Phil Kay
- Ford Kiernan (born 1962)
- Harry Lauder (1870–1950)
- David Law (1908–1971), cartoonist
- Brian Limond (born 1974)
- Jimmy Logan (1928–2001)
- Fred MacAulay (born 1956)
- Doon Mackichan (born 1962)
- Chic Murray (1919–1985)
- Jerry Sadowitz (born 1961)
- Iain Stirling (born 1988)
- Ian Tough (born 1947), one half of The Krankies
- Janette Tough (born 1947), A.K.A. Wee Jimmy Krankie
- Danny Wallace (born 1976)

== Military ==
- General James Abercrombie (1706–1781), British Army commander-in-chief of forces in North America during the French and Indian War
- Sir James Abercrombie, 1st Baronet of Edinburgh (died 1724), British Army officer and politician
- Major Sir Ralph Anstruther, 7th Baronet (1921–2002), British Army officer and courtier, awarded the Military Cross
- Major General Robert Keith Arbuthnott, 15th Viscount of Arbuthnott (1897–1966), senior British Army officer, serving in both World War I and World War II
- William Baillie, professional soldier in Swedish and Scottish Covenanter service
- General Sir David Baird, 1st Baronet (1757–1829), military leader
- Gilbert Balfour, 16th-century mercenary captain, probably having a leading role in the murder of Lord Darnley
- Michael Andreas Barclay de Tolly, Russian field marshal and minister of war during Napoleon's invasion in 1812 and War of the Sixth Coalition
- Sir Andrew Barton (c. 1466–1511), sailor from Leith, served as High Admiral of the Kingdom of Scotland
- King Robert the Bruce (1274–1329), Scotland's hero king and greatest warrior
- Calgacus
- Donald Cameron of Lochiel (c. 1700–1748), Jacobite commander during the 1745 rising
- Richard Cameron (c. 1648–1680), Republican Covenanter and founder of the "Cameronians"
- Lady Agnes Campbell (1526–1601), military leader in Ireland
- Colin Campbell, 1st Baron Clyde (1792–1863)
- Sir Colin Campbell (died 1296), warrior of Clan Campbell
- Robert Campbell of Glenlyon (1630–1696), one of the commanding officers at the Massacre of Glencoe
- Sandy Campbell (1898–1940), second lieutenant in the Royal Engineers, 9th Bomb Disposal Company; awarded the George Cross
- Sir Alexander Inglis Cochrane (1758–1832), senior Royal Navy commander during the Napoleonic Wars, achieving the rank of admiral
- Captain Archibald Cochrane (1783–1829), Royal Navy officer
- Colonel Hugh Stewart Cochrane (1829–1884), recipient of the Victoria Cross for his actions during the Indian Mutiny
- Air Chief Marshal the Honourable Sir Ralph Alexander Cochrane (1895–1977), pilot and Royal Air Force officer
- Thomas Cochrane, 10th Earl of Dundonald (1775–1860), Admiral in the Royal Navy
- Sir Thomas John Cochrane (1789–1872), Royal Navy First Sea Lord
- Ninian Cockburn (died 1579), soldier, officer of the Garde Écossaise, political intriguer
- Major General Samuel Cockburn (or Cobron) (c. 1574–1621), soldier in the service of Sweden
- General Sir James Henry Craig (1748–1812), British military officer and colonial administrator
- General Sir Alan Gordon Cunningham (1887–1983), British Army officer
- Admiral of the Fleet Andrew Cunningham, 1st Viscount Cunningham of Hyndhope (1883–1963), admiral of the World War II, brother of Alan
- James Currie (1756–1805), biographer of Robert Burns, early advocate of hydropathy
- Mark John Currie (1795–1874), explorer, founder settler of Western Australia, Admiral in the Royal Navy
- Field Marshal John Dalrymple, 2nd Earl of Stair (1673–1747), soldier and diplomat, commander at the Battle of Dettingen
- Tam Dalyell of the Binns (1615–1685), general
- Sir Archibald Douglas (c. 1298–1333), Regent of Scotland and leader of Scots forces at the Battle of Halidon Hill
- Sir James Douglas (c. 1287–1329), Warden of the Scottish Marches, military leader
- Air Commodore Douglas Douglas-Hamilton, 14th Duke of Hamilton (1903–1973), aristocrat, politician and aviator, the first to fly over Mount Everest
- Air Chief Marshal Hugh Caswall Tremenheere Dowding, 1st Baron Dowding (1882–1970), Air Officer Commanding RAF Fighter Command during the Battle of Britain
- George Keith Elphinstone, 1st Viscount Keith (1746–1823), admiral active throughout the Napoleonic Wars
- Major-General William George Keith Elphinstone (1782–1842), British Army officer
- Lieutenant Francis Anthony Blair Fasson, (1913–1942), Royal Navy officer, posthumously awarded George Cross, who captured codebooks vital to breaking the Enigma cipher
- Sir Adam Ferguson (1771–1855), keeper of the regalia in Scotland
- John Forbes (1707–1759), general
- Captain Douglas Ford (1918–1943), Royal Scots officer, prisoner of war, awarded the George Cross
- Gregor Fraser, Pipe Major, 92nd (Gordon Highlanders) Regiment of Foot
- Brigadier Simon Fraser, 15th Lord Lovat (1911–1995), prominent British Commando during the World War II
- Air Vice Marshal Sir Matthew Brown Frew (1895–1974), senior officer in the Royal Air Force and World War I flying ace
- Sir James Alexander Gordon (1782–1869), distinguished British officer in the Royal Navy
- Patrick Leopold Gordon of Auchleuchries (1635–1699), general and rear admiral in Russia
- James Graham, 1st Marquess of Montrose (1612–1650), Covenanter and Royalist leader of Highland Armies
- John Graham, Viscount (Bonnie) Dundee (c. 1648–1689), Jacobite Highland Army leader
- General Sir Thomas Graham, Lord Lynedoch (1748–1843), leading Napoleonic general
- Aleksey Samuilovich Greig (1775–1845), Russian admiral
- Samuel Greig (1736–1788), Russian admiral
- Douglas Haig (1861–1928), Commander of British Forces during World War I
- General Sir James Aylmer Lowthorpe Haldane (1862–1950), senior British Army officer
- Lieutenant General Sir David Henderson (1862–1921), British Army officer, authority on tactical intelligence, first commander of the Royal Flying Corps, instrumental in establishing the Royal Air Force
- Captain Ian Henry David Henderson (1896–1918), World War I flying ace
- General Henry Sinclair Horne, 1st Baron Horne (1861–1929), World War I general
- James Innes (c. 1700–1759), military commander and political figure in the Province of North Carolina
- James John McLeod Innes (1830–1907), recipient of the Victoria Cross for action during the Indian Rebellion of 1857
- John Paul Jones (1747–1792), father of the American Navy
- Alexander Leslie, 1st Earl of Leven (1582–1661), general, soldier in Dutch, Swedish and Scottish Covenanter service
- David Leslie, 1st Lord Newark (c. 1600–1682), cavalry officer and general in Swedish and Scottish Covenanter service
- Major-General Edward Douglas Loch, 2nd Baron Loch (1873–1942), senior British Army officer
- Granville Gower Loch (1813–1853), captain in the Royal Navy, killed in action in Burma
- Henry Brougham Loch, 1st Baron Loch (1827–1900), soldier and colonial administrator
- Sir Niall mac Cailein (died 1316), (Neil Campbell), nobleman and warrior in the service of King Robert I of Scotland
- Alasdair Mac Colla (c. 1610–1647), Royalist soldier
- Rob Roy MacGregor (1671–1734)
- Hugh Mackay (c. 1640–1692), general who served during the Revolution of 1688
- Colin Mackenzie (c. 1754–1821), soldier in British India
- Alexander Slidell MacKenzie, U.S. Navy
- Ranald Slidell Mackenzie, U.S. cavalryman
- General Sir Harry Aubrey de Vere Maclean (1848–1920), general, commander of the Moroccan Army
- Major-General Sir Fitzroy Maclean, 1st Baronet (1911–1996), soldier, writer and politician; reputed to be one of the men composing the compound of "Commando types" who inspired the Ian Fleming character James Bond
- Sam McDonald (1762–1802), "Big Sam", fencibles and gatekeeper for the Prince of Wales, noted for his unusual height
- Archie McKellar (1912–1940), Battle of Britain ace pilot
- Hugh Mercer (1726–1777), Continental Army general, fatally wounded at the Battle of Princeton
- Bill Millin (1922–2010), personal piper to Simon Fraser, 15th Lord Lovat
- Robert Monro (died c. 1680), general
- Richard Montgomery, Continental Army
- Admiral Sir Graham Moore (1764–1843), career officer in the Royal Navy, brother of Sir John Moore
- Lieutenant-General Sir John Moore (1761–1809), general, victor of the Battle of Corunna
- Andrew Moray (died 1297), military leader during the Scottish Wars of Independence
- Thomas Randolph, 1st Earl of Moray (c. 1278–1332), fought with King Robert I and James Lord of Douglas to regain Scotland's independence
- Admiral Sir Charles John Napier (1786–1860), naval officer and MP
- Captain Ian Patrick Robert Napier (1895–1977), World War I flying ace credited with twelve aerial victories
- William Napier, 9th Lord Napier (1786–1834), Royal Navy officer, politician and diplomat
- John Pitcairn (1722–1775), Marine officer, killed at the battle of Bunker Hill
- John Reid (1721–1807), British general and musical composer, who left a bequest to fund a chair in Music at the University of Edinburgh
- Acting Sergeant John Rennie (1920–1943), posthumously awarded the George Cross
- Roderick Sinclair, 19th Earl of Caithness (1906–1965), British brigadier, 1st Commander of the Sri Lanka Army
- Sir James Shaw Kennedy (1788–1865), general and military writer
- John Small (died 1796), British Army officer and Lieutenant-Governor of Guernsey
- Dr John Small (1823–1879), British Deputy Surgeon General
- James Dunlop Smith (1858–1921), official in the Indian Army
- Sir David Stirling (1915–1990), British Army colonel and founder of the Special Air Service
- Sir James Stirling (1791–1865), 1st governor of Western Australia, admiral in the Royal Navy
- Lord Stirling, American Revolutionary War General
- Prince Charles Edward Stuart (1720–1788), Jacobite field marshal and heir to the throne of Great Britain
- Sir John Urry (or Hurry) (died 1650), professional soldier
- William Wallace (c. 1270–1305), a.k.a. The Wallace
- Sir Andrew Wood of Largo (died 1515), sea captain and Lord High Admiral of Scotland

== Philosophers ==
- John Abercrombie (1780–1844)
- John Anderson (1726–1796), philosopher, radical and benefactor of Anderson's Institution
- John Anderson (1893–1962)
- Alexander Bain (1818–1903), philosopher and educationalist
- Hector Boece (1465–1536), known in Latin as Boethius, first Principal of King's College in Aberdeen
- H. Bricmore (fl. 14th century), scholastic philosopher
- Thomas Brown (1778–1820)
- Thomas Carlyle (1795–1881)
- William Cleghorn (1718–1754), philosopher
- Adam Ferguson (1723–1816)
- Sir William Hamilton (1788–1888)
- Henry Home, Lord Kames (1696–1782)
- David Hume (1711–1776), inspired Immanuel Kant (himself of Scottish Heritage through his mother)
- Alasdair MacIntyre (1929–2025)
- John Macmurray (1891–1976)
- John Mair, otherwise known as Major (1467–1550), teacher of George Buchanan, John Knox, and influencer of Calvin and Loyola
- William Manderstown (c. 1485–1552), philosopher and Rector of the University of Paris
- James McCosh (1811–1894)
- Thomas Reid (1710–1796), played an integral role in the Scottish Enlightenment
- Duns Scotus (1265–1308), teacher of William of Ockham
- William Small (1734–1775), Professor of Natural Philosophy at the College of William and Mary and member of the Lunar Society
- Adam Smith (1723–1790), economist, free trade, division of labour
- Dugald Stewart (1753–1828), common sense philosopher

== Physicians and medical professionals ==
- David Abercromby (died c.1702), physician and writer
- Francis Adams (1796–1861), medical doctor and translator of Greek medical works
- Dr John Adamson (1809–1870), physician, pioneer photographer, physicist, lecturer and museum curator
- James Ormiston Affleck (1840–1922), physician and medical author
- Margaret Forbes Alexander (living), nurse, educator, researcher and writer
- William Pulteney Alison (1790–1859), physician, social reformer and philanthropist
- John Maxwell Anderson (1928–1982), surgeon and cancer specialist
- Sir Thomas McCall Anderson (1836–1908), professor of practice of medicine at the University of Glasgow
- Archibald Arnott (1772–1855), British Army surgeon best remembered as Napoleon's last doctor on St. Helena
- Asher Asher (1837–1889), first Scottish Jew to enter the medical profession
- Matthew Baillie (1761–1823), physician and pathologist
- Sir Dugald Baird (1899–1986), specializing in obstetrics and fertility
- Sir Andrew Balfour (1873–1931), medical officer who specialised in tropical medicine
- Edward Balfour (1813–1889), surgeon, orientalist and pioneering environmentalist in India
- George William Balfour (1823–1903), physician, known as a heart specialist
- Thomas Graham Balfour (1813–1891), physician noted for his work in medical statistics
- Sir George Ballingall (1780–1855), Regius Professor of military surgery
- William Mitchell Banks (1842–1904), surgeon
- Major General William Burney Bannerman (1858–1924), military surgeon
- Andrew Whyte Barclay (1817–1884), physician, Lumleian Lecturer, and Harveian Orator
- George Steward Beatson (died 1874), surgeon-general, Honorary Physician to the Queen
- Colonel Sir George Thomas Beatson (1848–1933), physician, pioneer in the field of oncology
- William Beattie (1793–1875), physician and writer
- James Begbie (1798–1869), physician, president of the Medico-Chirurgical Society of Edinburgh and of the Royal College of Physicians of Edinburgh
- James Warburton Begbie (1826–1876), physician
- Benjamin Bell of Hunthill (1749–1806), considered to be the first Scottish scientific surgeon
- Sir Charles Bell (1774–1842), surgeon, anatomist, neurologist and philosophical theologian
- John Bell (1763–1820), anatomist and surgeon
- Sir James Whyte Black (1924–2010), physician and pharmacologist, winner of the Nobel Prize in Physiology or Medicine
- Dame Emily Mathieson Blair (1892–1963), nurse, Matron-in-Chief of the Princess Mary's Royal Air Force Nursing Service and the British Red Cross Society
- Sir Gilbert Blane of Blanefield (1749–1834), physician who instituted health reform in the Royal Navy
- James Borthwick of Stow (1615–1675), surgeon and first teacher of anatomy
- James Braid (1795–1860), surgeon and "gentleman scientist", influential pioneer of hypnotism and hypnotherapy
- John Milne Bramwell (1852–1925), physician, surgeon and medical hypnotist
- William A. F. Browne (1805–1885), one of the most significant asylum doctors of the nineteenth century
- Sir Thomas Lauder Brunton (1844–1916), physician known for treatment of angina pectoris
- William Buchan (1729–1805), physician, writer on medicine for a lay readership
- Maura Buchanan (living), nursing administrator, former president of the Royal College of Nursing
- Francis Buchanan-Hamilton (1762–1829), physician who made significant contributions as a geographer, zoologist, and botanist while living in India
- Sir Thomas Burnet (1638–1704), physician to Charles II, James II, William and Mary, and Queen Anne
- Ewan Cameron (1922–1991), physician who worked with Linus Pauling on Vitamin C research
- Murdoch Cameron (1847–1930), Regius Professor of Midwifery at the University of Glasgow
- Robina Thomson Cameron (1892–1971), district nurse, community leader and nursing inspector
- Dugald Campbell (died 1940), doctor from the isle of Arran; government physician on Hawaii
- Sir James Cantlie (1851–1926), physician, pioneer of First aid
- John Cheyne (1777–1836), physician, and medical writer; identified Cheyne–Stokes respiration, with William Stokes
- Colin Chisholm (1755–1825), surgeon, medical writer and Fellow of the Royal Society
- Mairi Lambert Gooden-Chisholm of Chisholm (1896–1981), military nurse and ambulance driver during World War I, awarded the Military Medal
- Sir Robert Christison (1797–1882), toxicologist and physician
- Sir James Clark (1788–1870), physician who was Physician-in-Ordinary to Queen Victoria
- Hugh Francis Clarke Cleghorn of Stravithie (1820–1895), physician, botanist, and forester who worked in India
- Sir Thomas Smith Clouston (1840–1915), psychiatrist
- Dr Samuel Cockburn (1823–1915), advocate and practitioner of homeopathy
- John Coldstream (1806–1863), physician
- James Copland (1791–1870), physician and prolific medical writer
- John Craig (died 1620), physician and astronomer; physician to James VI of Scotland
- David Craigie (1793–1866), physician and medical writer
- Sir Alexander Crichton (1763–1856), physician, including the Emperor of Russia's personal physician, and author
- Sir James Crichton-Browne (1840–1938), leading psychiatrist and medical psychologist
- William Cumin (died 1854), Regius Professor of Obstetrics and Gynaecology at the University of Glasgow
- David Douglas Cunningham (1843–1914), doctor and researcher in India, pioneer in aerobiology
- Daniel John Cunningham (1850–1909), physician, zoologist, and anatomist; author of medical textbooks
- Sir David Deas (1807–1876), medical officer in the Royal Navy
- Ian Donald (1910–1987), physician, pioneer of the use of diagnostic ultrasound in medicine
- Sir David Dumbreck (1805–1876), British Army medical officer
- Andrew Duncan, the elder (1744–1828), physician, professor at Edinburgh University, pioneer of forensic medicine
- Andrew Duncan, the younger (1773–1832), physician, first professor of medical jurisprudence at Edinburgh University
- James Matthews Duncan (1826–1890), physician, practitioner of and author on obstetrics
- William Ronald Dodds Fairbairn (1889–1964), psychiatrist, psychoanalyst, central figure in the development of the object relations theory of psychoanalysis
- Sir Walter Farquhar (1738–1819), physician, whose clientele included the future King George IV and William Pitt the Younger
- Elizabeth Blackburn Ferguson (1898-1901), physician and medical missionary who pioneered women's healthcare in Taiwan.
- William Fergusson (1773–1846), inspector-general of military hospitals; medical writer
- Charles Finnigan (1901–1967), dental surgeon, Surgeon Rear-Admiral in the Royal Navy, Honorary Dental Surgeon to the Queen
- James Forbes (1779–1837), inspector-general of army hospitals
- George Fordyce (1736–1802), physician, lecturer on medicine, and chemist
- Sir William Fordyce (1724–1792), physician, voted a gold medal for his work on rhubarb by the Society of Arts
- David Kennedy Fraser (1888–1962), psychologist, educator and amateur mathematician
- Margaret Neill Fraser (1880–1915), First World War nurse and notable amateur golfer, who died in Serbia
- John Gairdner (1790–1876), physician and president of the College of Surgeons of Edinburgh
- Sir William Tennant Gairdner (1824–1907), Professor of Medicine in the University of Glasgow
- Maxwell Garthshore (1732–1812), physician
- Marion Gilchrist (1864–1952), first female graduate of the University of Glasgow; first woman to qualify in medicine from a Scottish university; leading activist in Women's suffrage movement
- Theodore Gordon (1786–1845), inspector of army hospitals
- Robert Edmond Grant (1793–1874), physician and biologist
- James Gregory (1753–1821), physician and classicist
- Jane Stocks Greig (1872–1939), medical doctor and public health specialist in Australia
- Robert Marcus Gunn (1850–1909), ophthalmologist
- Daniel Rutherford Haldane (1824–1887), prominent physician, president of the Royal College of Physicians of Edinburgh
- Evelina Haverfield (1867–1920), suffragette and World War I nurse in Serbia
- Alexander Henderson (1780–1863), physician and author
- David Kennedy Henderson (1884–1965), psychiatrist
- Sir James William Beeman Hodsdon (1858–1928) eminent surgeon, president of the Royal College of Surgeons of Edinburgh 1914–1917
- Thomas Charles Hope (1766–1844), physician and chemist, discoverer of the element strontium
- Joseph Hume (1777–1855), physician and Radical MP
- John Hunter (1728–1793), surgeon, after whom the Hunterian Museum, London is named
- Sir Robert Hutchison (1871–1960), physician and paediatrician
- Elsie Inglis (1864–1917), medical reformer and suffragette
- John Scott Inkster, (1924–2011) anesthesiologist
- Robert Jackson (1750–1827), physician-surgeon, reformer, and inspector-general of army hospitals
- Louisa Jordan (1878–1915), nurse who died in Serbia during the First World War; NHS Louisa Jordan Hospital was named after her
- James Keill (1673–1719), physician, philosopher, medical writer and translator
- John Martin Munro Kerr (1868–1960), Regius Professor of Midwifery at the University of Glasgow
- R. D. Laing (1927–1989), psychiatrist and author
- Thomas Latta (1796–1833), pioneer of the saline solution method of treatment
- John Lauder (1683–1737), surgeon, deacon of the Royal College of Surgeons of Edinburgh
- Robert Lee (1793–1877), obstetrician, and personal physician to Prince Mikhail Semyonovich Vorontsov, Governor-General of the Crimea
- Lieutenant-General Sir William Boog Leishman (1865–1926), pathologist and army medical officer
- Sir John Liddell (1794–1868), Director-General of the Medical Department of the Royal Navy; senior medical officer of the Royal Hospital at Greenwich
- James Lind (1716–1794), physician, pioneer of naval hygiene in the Royal Navy
- Sir Henry Duncan Littlejohn (1826–1914), surgeon, forensic scientist and public health pioneer
- Robert Lumsden (1903–1973), ear, nose and throat (ENT) surgeon
- Sir William Macewen (1848–1924), surgeon, pioneer in modern brain surgery
- Jessie MacLaren MacGregor (1863–1906), one of the first women to be awarded an MD from the University of Edinburgh
- William Mackenzie (1791–1868), ophthalmologist, who wrote one of the first British textbooks of ophthalmology
- Sir William Alexander Mackinnon (1830–1897), Director-General of the British Army Medical Service
- Thomas John MacLagan (1838–1903), Dundee doctor and pharmacologist
- Patrick Manson (1844–1922), physician who made important discoveries in parasitology, founder of the field of tropical medicine
- Mary Adamson Anderson Marshall (1837–1910), physician, one of the members of the Edinburgh Seven, the first women to study medicine at the University of Edinburgh
- Douglas Mary McKain (1789–1873), New Zealand nurse, midwife and businesswoman
- Agnes McLaren (1837–1913), doctor, first to give medical assistance to women in India
- Gavin Milroy (1805–1886), physician and medical writer
- Alexander Monteith of Auldcathie (1660–1713), surgeon, deacon of the Incorporation of Surgeons of Edinburgh
- Neil Gordon Munro (1863–1942), physician and anthropologist, who studied the Ainu people
- Flora Murray (1869–1923), medical pioneer, and a member of the Women's Social and Political Union suffragettes
- Sir Robin MacGregor Murray (born 1944), psychiatrist and Professor of Psychiatric Research
- Duncan Napier, Victorian botanist and medical herbalist
- Bruce Milligan Nicol (1913-1987), physician and nutrition scientist
- Sir Alexander Nisbet (1795–1874), naval surgeon, H.M. Inspector of Hospitals for the Royal Navy
- William Nisbet (1759–1822), physician, author of widely used medical books that emphasized practice
- Sir Alexander Ogston (1844–1929), surgeon, famous for his discovery of Staphylococcus
- Alexander Pennycuik (1605–1695), military surgeon, Surgeon General of the Scots forces in Ireland
- David Pitcairn (1749–1809), physician
- Archibald Pitcairne (1652–1713), physician and author
- Richard Poole (1783–1871), physician, psychiatrist, and phrenologist
- George Hogarth Pringle (1830–1872), surgeon, pioneer of antiseptic surgery in Australia
- John James Pringle (1855–1922), dermatologist
- Laidlaw Purves (1842–1917), aural and ophthalmic surgeon
- John Rattray (1707–1771), surgeon, surgeon to Prince Charles Edward Stuart and golfer
- David Boswell Reid (1805–1863), physician, chemist and inventor
- Agnes Reston (1771–1856), wartime nurse during the Peninsular War, known as the Heroine of Matagorda, for her outstanding bravery
- John Roberton (1776–1840), physician and social reformer
- John Roberton (1797–1876), physician and social reformer
- Thomas Ferguson Rodger (1907–1978), physician, Royal Army Medical Corps brigadier, and Professor of Psychological Medicine
- Elizabeth Ness MacBean Ross (1878–1915), physician who worked in Persia, and died in Serbia
- Catherine Murray Roy, military nurse during World War I, awarded the Military Medal for conspicuous gallantry
- John Rutherford (1695–1779), physician and professor at the University of Edinburgh Medical School; grandfather of Sir Walter Scott
- Helenus Scott (1760–1821), physician, active in India
- Lyall Stuart Scott (1920–1977), surgeon and urologist
- Thomas Shortt (1788–1843), army physician, who drafted Napoleon's official autopsy report
- James Young Simpson (1811–1870), introduced chloroform into surgery
- David Skae (1814–1873), physician who specialised in psychological medicine
- Alexander Small (1710–1794), surgeon and scholar
- John Smith (1825–1910), dentist, philanthropist and pioneering educator, founder of the Edinburgh school of dentistry
- James Carmichael Smyth (1741–1821), physician and medical writer
- William Somerville (1771–1860), physician, inspector of the Army Medical Board, husband of Mary Somerville
- James Syme (1799–1870), pioneering surgeon
- Michael Waistell Taylor (1824–1892), physician and antiquary
- Thomas Stewart Traill (1781–1862), physician, chemist, mineralogist, meteorologist, zoologist and scholar of medical jurisprudence
- Gordon Turnbull, psychiatrist and author
- Andrew Ure (1778–1857), physician, scholar and chemist
- Charles Howard Usher (1865–1942), ophthalmologist
- Agnes Vetch (1842-1942), nurse who contributed to the development of modern nursing education in Japan.
- James Wardrop (1782–1869), surgeon and ophthalmologist
- Robert Watt (1774–1819), physician and bibliographer
- Alexander Allan Innes Wedderburn (9 May 1935 – 23 February 2017), psychologist and emeritus Professor of Psychology at the Heriot-Watt University.
- Sir David Wilkie (1882–1938), surgeon, pioneer of surgical research and undergraduate teaching
- Robert Willis (1799–1878), physician, librarian, and medical historian
- James Wilson (1765–1821), anatomist
- Professor Nairn Hutchison Fulton Wilson (born 1950), Honorary Professor of Dentistry, former Dean and Head of King's College London Dental Institute
- Alexander Wood (1725–1807), surgeon, and friend of the poet Robert Burns
- Alexander Wood (1817–1884), physician, inventor of the first true hypodermic syringe
- John McLeod (surgeon) (c. 1777 – 1820), naval surgeon and travel writer

== Rulers and politicians ==
- Sir William Arbuthnot, 1st Baronet (1766–1829), Lord Provost of Edinburgh and Lord Lieutenant of the City of Edinburgh
- James Abercromby, 1st Baron Dunfermline (1776–1858), barrister and Speaker of the House of Commons between 1835 and 1839
- Sir Andrew Agnew, 7th Baronet (1793–1849), politician and prominent promoter of Sunday Sabbatarianism
- James Alexander (1691–1756), attorney general of New Jersey
- John Baird (1790–1820), revolutionary
- Robert Barton of Over Barnton (died 1540), merchant, sailor and politician; as Comptroller, Master of the Mint and Lord High Treasurer
- Cardinal David Beaton (c. 1494–1546)
- Dr. James Beaton (1473–1539), church leader, and the Keeper of the Great Seal of Scotland
- Sir Robert Duncan Bell (1878–1953), colonial administrator in India; Acting Governor of Bombay in 1937
- Tony Blair (born 1953), Labour Prime Minister of the United Kingdom (1997–2007)
- Henry Brougham, 1st Baron Brougham and Vaux (1778–1868), statesman, one of the founders of the Edinburgh Review, Lord Chancellor
- Gordon Brown (born 1951), Labour Prime Minister of the United Kingdom (2007–2010)
- James Bryce, 1st Viscount Bryce, (1838–1922), academic, jurist, historian and Liberal politician
- Sir Henry Campbell-Bannerman (1836–1908), statesman, Liberal Party politician and Prime Minister of the United Kingdom (1905–1908)
- Alexander Chalmers (Polish: Aleksander Czamer) (1645–1703), four time mayor of Warsaw
- Charles I of Scotland and of England (1625–1649)
- Sir Hugh Cleghorn (1752–1837), first colonial secretary to Ceylon
- Adam Cockburn, Laird of Ormiston, Lord Ormiston (1656–1735), administrator, politician and judge
- Sir Alexander Cockburn, 12th Baronet (1802–1880), lawyer, politician and judge, Lord Chief Justice of England and Wales
- Archibald Cockburn (c. 1738–1820), politician
- John Cockburn of Ormiston (died 1583), early supporter of the Scottish Reformation
- John Cockburn of Ormiston (died 1758), politician, known as the father of Scottish husbandry
- Sir Richard Cockburn of Clerkington (died 1627), senior government official, Keeper of the Privy Seal of Scotland
- John Comyn III of Badenoch (c.1274–1306), baron and magnate, murdered by Robert the Bruce
- James Connolly (1868–1916), Irish socialist leader, executed by firing squad following the Easter Rising
- John Crawfurd (1783–1868), colonial administrator, diplomat, physician and author
- Dubacan of Angus (fl 10th century), first named mormaer, Mormaer of Angus
- Robert Bontine Cunninghame Graham ("Don Roberto") (1852–1936), first socialist Member of Parliament (MP)
- Sir Frederick Currie, 1st Baronet (1799–1875)
- James Dalrymple, 1st Viscount of Stair (1619–1695), lawyer and statesman
- John Dalrymple, 1st Earl of Stair, Secretary of State over Scotland, implicated in the Massacre of Glencoe
- Tam Dalyell (1932–2017), British Labour politician
- Ian Davidson (born 1950), Labour Co-operative politician
- Ruth Davidson (born 1978), leader of the Scottish Conservative Party since 2011
- Donald Dewar (1937–2000), former First Minister of Scotland
- Robert Dinwiddie (1693–1770), Lieutenant-Governor of Virginia 1751–1758
- James Douglas, 4th Earl of Morton (1525–1581), Regent of Scotland
- Alec Douglas-Home (1903–1995), Conservative Prime minister of the United Kingdom
- Iain Duncan Smith (born 1954), leader of the Conservative party
- Henry Dundas, 1st Viscount Melville (1742–1811), advocate and Tory politician
- Mountstuart Elphinstone (1779–1859), statesman and historian, associated with the government of British India
- William Elphinstone (1431–1514), statesman, Bishop of Aberdeen and founder of the University of Aberdeen
- Alex Fergusson (1949–2018), third Presiding Officer of the Scottish Parliament
- Andrew Fletcher of Saltoun (1653–1716)
- Archibald Fletcher (1746–1828), political reformer
- Liam Fox (born 1961), Conservative politician
- George Galloway (born 1954), Respect Party
- Annabel Goldie (born 1950), former leader of the Scottish Conservative Party
- Charles Grant, 1st Baron Glenelg (1778–1866), politician and colonial administrator
- Sir Robert Grant (1779–1838), lawyer and politician
- Iain Gray (born 1957), Scottish Labour Party politician
- Jo Grimond (1913–1993), Liberal Party leader from 1956 to 1967
- Alexander Hamilton (1755-1804), US Secretary of the Treasury, one of the Founding Fathers of the United States
- James Hamilton, 2nd Earl of Arran (1516–1575), Regent of Scotland
- Andrew Hardie (died 1820), revolutionary
- Keir Hardie (1856–1915)
- Patrick Harvie (born 1973), co-convenor of the Scottish Greens since 2003
- Alexander Henderson (c. 1583–1646), theologian, ecclesiastical statesman and co-author of the National Covenant
- David B. Henderson (1840–1906), politician and Speaker of the United States House of Representatives from 1899 to 1903
- Hugh Henry (born 1952), Scottish Labour politician
- Francis Horner (1778–1817), Whig politician, journalist, lawyer and political economist
- King James IV (1473–1513)
- James VI of Scotland and I of England (1603–1625)
- Archibald Johnston, Lord Warriston (1611–1663), judge, statesman and co-author of the National Covenant
- James Johnston (1655–1737), envoy extraordinary to Prussia, Secretary of State over Scotland, and Lord Clerk Register
- Charles Kennedy (1959–2015), leader of the Liberal Democrats 1999–2006
- Sir William Kirkcaldy of Grange (c. 1520–1573), politician and soldier, who held Edinburgh Castle on behalf of Mary, Queen of Scots
- Johann Lamont (born 1957), leader of the Scottish Labour Party since 2011
- John Loughton (born 1987), political campaigner and winner of reality show Big Brother: Celebrity Hijack in 2008
- Sir John Lyon, Thane of Glamis (c1340–1382), Chamberlain of Scotland between 1377 and 1382
- Arthur MacArthur, Sr. Governor of Wisconsin and grandfather of Gen. Douglas MacArthur
- Macbeth of Scotland (c. 1005–1057), High King of Scotland
- John MacCormick (1904–1961), nationalist
- John A. Macdonald (1815–1891), first Prime Minister of Canada
- Malcolm MacDonald (1901–1981)
- Ramsay MacDonald (1866–1937), Prime Minister of the United Kingdom
- Ken Macintosh (born 1962), fifth Presiding Officer of the Scottish Parliament
- Alexander Mackenzie (1822–1892), second Prime Minister of Canada
- John P Mackintosh (1929–1978), Labour MP, Politics Professor at Edinburgh University and proponent of devolution
- John MacLean (1879–1923), revolutionary
- Máel Coluim, Earl of Angus (fl 13th century), mormaer of Angus c.1214-1240; last of the male line with that title
- Tricia Marwick (born 1953), fourth Presiding Officer of the Scottish Parliament
- Mary, Queen of Scots (1542–1587)
- Jimmy Maxton (1885–1946), leader of the Independent Labour Party
- Jack McConnell (born 1960), First Minister of Scotland (2001–2007)
- Christina McKelvie (born 1968), Scottish National Party
- William McKinley (1843–1901), US President
- Henry McLeish (born 1948), former First Minister
- Duncan McNeill, 1st Baron Colonsay (1793–1874), advocate, judge and Tory politician
- George Mealmaker (1768–1808), radical organiser and writer
- James Monroe (1758-1831), US President, one of the Founding Fathers of the United States
- Thomas Muir (1765–1799), political reformer
- John Murdoch (1818–1903), land reform campaigner, newspaper owner and editor
- Jim Murphy (born 1967), Labour Party
- Robert Dale Owen (1801–1877), American social reformer and politician
- Jerry Rawlings (born 1947), former president of Ghana; partly of Scottish descent
- George Reid (born 1939), second Presiding Officer of the Scottish Parliament 2003–2007
- Jimmy Reid (1932–2010), trade union activist, orator, politician, and journalist
- Willie Rennie (born 1967), leader of the Scottish Liberal Democrats since 2011
- Alex Salmond (born 1954), former First Minister of Scotland (2007–14) and former leader of the Scottish National Party
- Sir John Scot, Lord Scotstarvit (1585–1670), laird, advocate, judge, politician and author
- Tavish Scott (born 1956), former leader of the Scottish Liberal Democrats
- Tommy Sheridan (born 1964), Solidarity
- Jim Sillars (born 1937), founder of Scottish Labour Party, MP
- Archibald Sinclair, 1st Viscount Thurso (1890–1970), Liberal Party leader from 1935 to 1945
- William Skirving (c. 1745–1796), radical
- Ian Smith (1919–2007), Prime Minister of Rhodesia
- John Smith (1938–1994), Labour Party leader
- David Steel (born 1938), Liberal Party leader from 1976 to 1988, first Presiding Officer of the Scottish Parliament
- Nicol Stephen (born 1960), former leader of the Scottish Liberal Democrats
- Nicola Sturgeon (born 1970), First Minister of Scotland (since 2014) and Leader of the Scottish National Party
- John Swinney (born 1964), Scottish National Party (SNP) politician
- Alexander Wedderburn, 1st Earl of Rosslyn (1733–1805), Lord Chancellor of Great Britain from 1793 to 1801
- Sir William Wedderburn, 4th Baronet (1838–1918), civil servant in India and politician
- Elizabeth (Eliza) Wigham (1820–1899), leading suffragist and abolitionist
- Jane Wigham (née Smeal) (1801–1888), leading Scottish abolitionist
- James Wilson (1760–1820), revolutionary
- James Wilson (1742–1798), one of the Founding Fathers of the United States, signatory of the United States Declaration of Independence
- John Witherspoon (1723–1794), Scottish-American Presbyterian minister, educator, farmer, Founding Father of the United States
- Robert Crichton Wyllie (1798–1865), physician and businessman, Minister of Foreign Affairs in the Kingdom of Hawaii

== Sportspeople ==
- Gary Anderson (born 1970), professional darts player
- Robert Archibald (1980–2020), first Scottish NBA player
- John Baird (1870–1905), footballer
- Imogen Bankier (born 1987), badminton player, winner of the national championships
- Alain Baxter (born 1973), alpine skier
- Jim Baxter (1939–2001), footballer
- Andy Beattie (1913–1983), professional football player and manager, the first manager of the Scottish national team
- Eric Brown (1925–1986), professional golfer
- Hamish Brown (born 1934), first person to walk all the Munros in a single trip
- Kathryn Bryce (born 1997), cricketer in Scotland women's national cricket team, first Scots cricketer in the top ten of the ICC Women's Player Rankings
- Sarah Bryce (born 2000), cricketer in Scotland women's national cricket team
- Ken Buchanan (born 1945), world champion boxer
- Euan Burton (born 1979), judo expert, who represented Great Britain at the 2008 and 2012 Summer Olympics in the Half-Middleweight (under 81 kg) Judo event
- Sir Matt Busby (1909–1994), former football manager, won the European Cup in 1968
- John Bute (also known as Johnny Dumfries) (1958–2021), peer and racing driver, winner of the 1988 24 Hours of Le Mans
- Willie Carson (born 1942), jockey
- Jim Clark (1936–1968), Formula One driver
- John Cochrane (1798–1878), chess player
- Steph Cook (born 1972), modern pentathlete, Olympic gold medallist
- Gillian Cooke (born 1982), athlete and bobsledder
- Davie Cooper (1956–1995), footballer
- Kay Copland, sport shooter
- David Coulthard (born 1971), Formula One driver
- Stevie Crawford, professional football player and coach of Dunfermline Athletic F.C.
- Kenny Dalglish (born 1951), retired footballer and former manager of Liverpool F.C.
- George Fairbairn, professional rugby league footballer and Scotland coach
- Crawford Fairbrother (1936–1986), Olympic high jumper
- Sir Alex Ferguson (born 1941), retired footballer and former manager of Manchester United F.C.
- Darren Fletcher (born 1984), international footballer
- Ron Flockhart (1923–1962), racing driver, twice winner of the 24 Hours of Le Mans
- David Florence (born 1982), slalom canoeist
- Dario Franchitti (born 1973), Indy car driver
- Marino Franchitti (born 1978), American Le Mans driver
- Steve Frew (born 1973), gymnast, gold medallist in Commonwealth games 2002
- Adam Kelso Fulton (1929–1994), international rugby player
- Bernard Gallacher (born 1949), professional golfer
- Drew Galloway (born 1985), professional wrestler
- Richie Gray (born 1989), rugby player
- Jack Grimmer (born 1994), footballer
- Wyndham Halswelle (1882–1915), Olympic champion runner
- Dougal Haston (1940–1977), mountaineer
- Joe Hendry (1886–1966), footballer
- Stephen Hendry (born 1969), professional snooker player, 7 time world champion
- John Higgins (born 1975), professional snooker player, three-time world champion
- Chris Hoy (born 1976), world, Olympic and Commonwealth champion track cyclist
- Gerry Hughes (born 1958), sailor, first single-handed Atlantic crossing by a deaf person
- Gary Jacobs, Scottish, British, Commonwealth, and European (EBU) welterweight champion boxer
- Jimmy Johnstone (1944–2006), football player
- George Kerr (born 1937), judo expert, winner of the 1957 gold medal in the European Judo Championships
- John Kerr (born 1980), ice dancer
- Sinead Kerr (born 1978), ice dancer
- Dominic Kinnear (born 1967), former soccer player, now the head coach of Houston Dynamo in Major League Soccer
- Billy Kirkwood (born 1958), football player
- Martin Laird (born 1982), golfer
- Denis Law (born 1940), football player
- Paul Lawrie (born 1969), golfer, winner 1999 Open Championship
- Andrew Lemoncello (born 1982), long-distance runner
- Eric Liddell (1902–1945), athlete, one of the two subjects of Chariots of Fire
- Patricia Littlechild (born 1965), sport shooter
- Jackie Lockhart (born 1965), curler, skip of Scotland team which won the 2002 world championships
- Sandy Lyle (born 1958), golfer, winner of 1985 Open Championship and 1988 Masters Tournament
- Benny Lynch (1913–1946), world champion boxer
- Hamish MacInnes (1930–2020), mountaineer
- Craig MacLean (born 1971), world, Olympic and Commonwealth champion track cyclist
- Shona Marshall, sport shooter
- Rhona Martin (born 1966), curler, Olympic gold medallist
- Catriona Matthew (born 1969), golfer
- Ally McCoist (born 1962), football player
- Robert McCoig (1937–1998) badminton player.
- James McFadden (born 1983), footballer
- William McGregor (1846–1911), founder of the Football League in England
- Neil McMenemy, triple jumper
- Jackie McNamara (born 1973), footballer and manager
- Billy McNeill (born 1940), footballer and a manager of Celtic F.C.
- Allan McNish (born 1969), racing driver
- Colin McRae (1968–2007), world champion rally driver
- Dick McTaggart (born 1935), boxer
- Micky Mellon (born 1972), ex-footballer, football manager
- David Millar (born 1977), road cyclist
- Robert Millar (born 1958), professional cyclist, "King of the Mountains" in 1984 Tour de France
- Willie Miller (born 1955), international footballer and captain of Aberdeen when they won the European Cup Winners' Cup in 1983
- Colin Montgomerie (born 1963), golfer, winner of European Tour Order of Merit a record 8 times
- Janice Moodie (born 1973), golfer
- Hugh Munro (1856–1919), mountaineer, known for his list of mountains
- Bernard Murphy (born 18??), footballer
- Andy Murray (born 1987), tennis player, singles, Wimbledon winner 2013, 2016 gentleman's singles, 2012 Olympic Champion, men's singles, US Open champion 2012, men's singles.
- Jamie Murray (born 1986), tennis player, doubles, Wimbledon winner 2007 mixed doubles
- Steve Nicol (born 1961), footballer, most notably of Liverpool F.C.
- Peter Niven (born 19??), jockey
- Graeme Obree (born 1965), world record holding cyclist
- Stewart Pitt (born 1968), slalom canoeist
- Graeme Randall (born 1975), judo expert, World Judo Championships gold medallist
- Shirley Robertson (born 1968), sailor and Olympic gold medallist
- Bill Shankly (1913–1981), one of Liverpool F.C.'s most successful managers
- Graeme Souness (born 1953), football player and manager
- Ian Stark (born 1954), equestrian
- Jock Stein (1922–1985), football manager, won the European Cup with Celtic F.C.
- Sir Jackie Stewart (born 1939), world champion Formula One driver
- Frederick Guthrie Tait (1870–1900), amateur golfer and soldier
- Bobby Thomson (1923–2010), Scots-born American baseball player
- Sam Torrance (born 1953), golfer
- Lawrence Tynes (born 1978), Scots-born kicker for the New York Giants and Kansas City Chiefs
- Steven Vidler (born 1977), middleweight judo expert, Commonwealth Games bronze medallist
- Andrew Watson (1856–1921), world's first black international football player, captain and administrator
- Jim Watt (born 1948), world champion boxer, won the WBC World Lightweight title
- Harry Weld-Forester (born 1981), cricketer
- David Wilkie (born 1954), swimmer
- Jocky Wilson (1950–2012), world professional darts champion in 1982 and 1989
- Mike Zagorski (born 1979), cyclist

== Television and radio personalities ==
- Kaye Adams (born 1962)
- Ronni Ancona (born 1968)
- Dougie Anderson (born 1976)
- Fiona Armstrong (born 1956)
- Jackie Bird (born 1962)
- Edith Bowman (born 1975)
- Frankie Boyle (born 1972), comedian
- Gordon Buchanan (born 1972), wildlife filmmaker
- Bryan Burnett, television and radio presenter
- Nicky Campbell (born 1962)
- Kelly Cates (born 1975)
- Kate Copstick
- Stuart Cosgrove (born 1952)
- Tam Cowan (born 1969)
- Cat Cubie (born 1981)
- Romana D'Annunzio (born 1972)
- Jim Delahunt
- Dominik Diamond (born 1969)
- Jack Docherty (born 1962)
- John Dunn (1934–2004), radio presenter
- Kieron Elliot
- Jenni Falconer (born 1976)
- Craig Ferguson (born 1962)
- Tommy Flanagan (born 1965)
- Sandy Gall (born 1927)
- Kirsty Gallacher (born 1976)
- George Galloway (born 1954)
- Graeme Garden (born 1943)
- Muriel Gray (born 1959), journalist
- Amanda Hamilton (born 1974)
- Sarah Heaney (born 1971)
- Stuart Henry (1942–1995), disc jockey
- Mikey Hughes (born 1974)
- Hazel Irvine (born 1965)
- Stephen Jardine (born 1963)
- Alan Johnston (born 1962), journalist
- Nicci Jolly (born 1981)
- Lorraine Kelly (born 1959)
- Fiona Kennedy
- Ross King (born 1961)
- John Leslie (born 1965)
- Viv Lumsden (born 1952)
- Fred MacAulay (born 1956)
- Cathy MacDonald
- Phil MacHugh (born 1985)
- Sarah Mack (born 1973)
- John MacKay
- Aggie MacKenzie (born 1955)
- Sally Magnusson (born 1955)
- Eddie Mair (born 1965)
- Andrew Marr (born 1959)
- Colin McAllister (born 1968)
- Ian McCaskill (1938–2016)
- Scottie McClue (born 1956)
- Sheena McDonald (born 1954)
- Gail McGrane (born 1975)
- Paul McGuire
- Gillian McKeith (born 1959)
- Andrea McLean (born 1969)
- Rhona McLeod
- Michelle McManus (born 1980)
- Cameron McNeish
- Aasmah Mir (born 1971)
- Paul Mitchell (born 1968)
- Arthur Montford (1929–2014)
- Nick Nairn (born 1959), celebrity chef
- Shereen Nanjiani (born 1961)
- Neil Oliver (born 1967)
- Dawn Porter (born 1979)
- Gail Porter (born 1971)
- Angus Purden (born 1974)
- Judith Ralston
- Gordon Ramsay (born 1966), celebrity chef
- Heather Reid (born 1969)
- Fyfe Robertson (1902–1987)
- Tom Russell (born 1948)
- Justin Ryan (born 1967)
- Isla St Clair (born 1952)
- Catriona Shearer (born 1981)
- Angus Simpson
- Carol Smillie (born 1961)
- Sarah Smith (born 1968)
- Iain Stirling (born 1988)
- Grant Stott
- Cameron Stout (born 1971)
- Heather Suttie
- Brian Taylor (born 1955)
- Bill Torrance (born 1946)
- Alison Walker (born 1963)
- Kirsty Wark (born 1955), journalist
- Tom Weir (1914–2006)
- Jim White
- Kirsty Young (born 1968)

== Theologians, pastors and missionaries ==
- David Laird Adams (1837–1892), minister and academic, professor of Hebrew and oriental languages at the University of Edinburgh.
- Patrick Adamson, 16th-century Archbishop of St Andrews
- Reverend William Menzies Alexander (1858–1929), medical and theological writer, Professor of Divinity
- Tom Allan (died 1965), minister and evangelist, pioneer of practical church outreach in social work, primarily in the city of Glasgow
- Charles Arbuthnot (1737–1820), Scottish abbot of the Scots Monastery, Regensburg
- George Husband Baird (1761–1840), minister, educational reformer, linguist and Principal of the University of Edinburgh
- Donald Macpherson Baillie (1887–1954), theologian, ecumenist, and parish minister
- John Baillie (1886–1960), theologian and Church of Scotland minister
- James Bannerman, (1807–1868), Free Church of Scotland theologian
- William Barclay (1907–1978), author, Church of Scotland minister, Professor of Divinity and Biblical Criticism at the University of Glasgow
- James Barr (1924–2006)
- John Blackadder (c. 1622–1685), eminent Presbyterian Covenanter preacher
- Robert Blackadder (d. 1508), first archbishop of Glasgow
- Hugh Blair (1718–1800), minister of religion, author and rhetorician
- James Blair (1656–1743), Church of England clergyman, missionary and founder of the College of William & Mary, in Williamsburg, Virginia
- Robert Blair (1837–1907), Church of Scotland minister
- David Bogue (1750–1825), nonconformist leader, and missionary to Penang
- Thomas Boston (1676–1732), pastor and theologian
- Claudius Buchanan (1766–1815), theologian, minister of the Church of England, and missionary to India
- William Chalmers Burns (1815–1868), revival preacher, missionary to China
- Richard Cameron (c. 1648–1680), a leader of the Covenanters
- Andrew Cant (1590–1663), Presbyterian minister and leader of the Covenanters
- Very Rev Alexander Carlyle (1722–1805), church leader, and autobiographer
- James Chalmers (1841–1901), missionary, active in New Guinea
- Dugald Christie (1855–1936), medical missionary in Mukden, China
- William Robinson Clark (1829–1912), Dean of Taunton and later professor in Toronto
- Thomas Richardson Colledge (1796–1879), medical missionary in China, founder and first president of the Medical Missionary Society of China
- Daniel "Dan" Crawford (1870–1926), known as 'Konga Vantu', missionary of the Plymouth Brethren in central-southern Africa
- William Cunningham (1805–1861), leading Free Church pastor and professor
- David Dickson (c. 1583–1663), theologian and Covenanter
- David Dickson (1780–1842), minister and writer
- John Dudgeon (1837–1901), doctor, surgeon, translator, and medical missionary
- Rev Alexander Duff (1806–1878), first overseas missionary of the Church of Scotland to India
- Ebenezer Erskine (1680–1754), minister whose actions led to the establishment of the Secession Church
- Ralph Erskine (1685–1752), preacher and poet
- Andrew Martin Fairbairn (1838–1912), theological scholar, principal of Mansfield College, Oxford
- Patrick Fairbairn (1805–1874), minister and theologian
- Henry Faulds (1843–1930), missionary to Japan, physician, and scientist noted for the development of fingerprinting
- Alexander Penrose Forbes (1817–1875)
- George Hay Forbes (1821–1875), priest of the Scottish Episcopal Church, founder of the Pitsligo Press
- John Forbes (1571–1606), Capuchin friar, known as Father Archangel
- Peter Taylor Forsyth (1848–1921), theologian, principal of Hackney College, London
- James Frazer (1854–1941), anthropologist of comparative religion and myth
- Alexander Geddes (1737–1802), theologian and scholar
- Alexander Gerard (1728–1795), minister, academic and philosophical writer
- John George Govan (1861–1927), founder of the Faith Mission
- Patrick Graham (d. 1478), first Archbishop of St Andrews
- Daniel Gunn (1774–1848), Scottish congregational minister, latterly in Christchurch, Hampshire
- Thomas Guthrie (1803–1873), divine and philanthropist
- William Guthrie (1620–1665), author of "The Christian's Great Interest"
- James Alexander Haldane (1768–1851), independent church leader
- Robert Haldane (1764–1842), missionary preacher and lecturer; wrote a commentary on Romans
- Patrick Hamilton (1504–1528), first Protestant martyr in Scotland, burnt at the stake in 1528
- William Hastie (1842–1903), clergyman, theologian and translator of the Universal Natural History and Theory of Heaven by Immanuel Kant
- Alexander Henderson (1583–1646)
- James Hog (c. 1658–1734), minister at Carnock, known for his role in the Marrow controversy within the Church of Scotland
- Richard Holloway (born 1933)
- William Irvine (1863–1947), evangelist and founder of the Cooneyite and Two by Two sects
- Robert Reid Kalley (1809–1888), physician and Presbyterian missionary notable for work in Portuguese-speaking territories
- John Knox (c. 1513–1572), leader of the Scottish Reformation
- Robert Leighton (1611–1684), Archbishop of Glasgow, Principal of the University of Edinburgh from 1653 to 1662
- Thomas Leishman (1825–1904), minister and liturgical scholar
- David Lindsay, 1st Duke of Montrose (1440–1495), first Scottish non-royal duke, Lord High Admiral of Scotland, Master of the Royal Household of Scotland, Great Chamberlain and Justiciar
- David Livingstone (1813–1873), missionary and explorer in Africa
- Alexander Mackay (1849–1890), Presbyterian missionary to Uganda
- Hugh Martin (1822–1885), pastor and writer
- Matilda, Countess of Angus, (fl. 13th century), heiress of Maol Choluim, countess in her own right
- Robert Murray M'Cheyne (1813–1843), minister of the Gospel, missionary to the Jewish people
- Thomas M'Crie the Elder (1772–1835), pastor and historian (wrote the 'Life of John Knox')
- William Milligan (1821–1892), theologian, professor at the University of Aberdeen
- Robert Moffat (1795–1883), missionary to Africa
- Saint Mungo (also known as Saint Kentigern) (d. 614)
- John Murray (1898–1975), Calvinist theologian and Presbyterian minister
- George Newlands
- John Paton (1824–1907), Protestant missionary to the New Hebrides Islands of the South Pacific
- Alexander Peden (1626–1686), leading figures in the Covenanter movement
- William Pettigrew (1869–1943), missionary to the Tangkhul Naga
- Dr John Philip (1775–1851), missionary in South Africa
- Robert Pont (or Kylpont) (1524–1606), reformer, lord of session, minister in Edinburgh and St. Andrews
- The Revd Professor Norman Walker Porteous (1898–2003), translator of the Bible
- Andrew Purves (born 1946), theologian
- James Renwick (1662–1688), covenanter and martyr
- Samuel Rutherford (c. 1600–1661), Presbyterian pastor, theologian and author, one of the Scottish Commissioners to the Westminster Assembly
- John Duns Scotus (c. 1266–1308)
- James Sharp (1613–1679), assassinated Archbishop of St Andrews
- John Simson (c. 1668–1740), New Licht theologian, involved in a long investigation for heresy
- Mary Slessor (1848–1915), missionary and advocate for women's rights
- George Washington Sprott (1829–1909), minister and liturgical scholar
- George Thomson (1819–1878), missionary and botanist in Cameroon
- Thomas Torrance (1871–1959), missionary to China
- Thomas F. Torrance (1913–2007), theologian
- James Wedderburn (1585–1639), bishop of Dunblane, grandson of the poet James Wedderburn
- John Welsh of Ayr (1568–1622), pastor exiled for faithful preaching; son-in-law to John Knox
- John Willock (c. 1515–1585), Protestant reformer
- George Wishart (1513–1546), Protestant reformer and martyr

== Other notable people ==
- John Adair (c. 1655–1722), surveyor and cartographer
- Dr Hely Hutchinson Almond (1832–1903), educator and rugby union promoter
- Jane Arthur (1827–1907), feminist and activist
- Col. David Barclay (1610–1686), 1st Laird of Urie, a convert to Quakerism
- Robert Barclay (1648–1690), Quaker, governor of the East Jersey colony
- Andrew Bell (1753–1832), developer of the Madras system of education
- Harry Benson (born 1929), celebrity and pop culture photographer
- John Boyd (1925–2018), milliner based in London
- James Braidwood (1800–1861), founder of the world's first municipal fire service in Edinburgh in 1824, and first director of the London Fire Engine Establishment
- Thomas Braidwood (1715–1806), teacher of the deaf
- John Brown (1826–1883), servant of Queen Victoria
- John Brown (1627–1685), Covenanter martyr
- Kenn Burke, ballet dancer
- John Cairncross (1913–1995), intelligence officer and spy during World War II, alleged to be the fifth member of the Cambridge Five
- Charles Cameron (1927–2001), magician, godfather of bizarre magic
- Ajahn Candasiri (born 1947), Theravāda Buddhist nun who co-founded Chithurst Buddhist Monastery
- Michael Caton-Jones (born 1957), film director
- William Chambers (born 1979), award-winning hat designer
- Walter Chepman (fl. c. 1500), merchant, notary and civil servant; in partnership with Androw Myllar in Scotland's first printing press
- Mary Crudelius (née Maclean, 1839–1877), campaigner for women's education, and a supporter of women's suffrage
- Alexander Cruden (1699–1770), compiler of an early concordance to the Bible
- Lord Curriehill (1549–1617), prosecutor, ambassador, and judge
- Alexander Dalrymple (1737–1808), geographer and the first Hydrographer of the British Admiralty
- James Dawson (1806–1900), prominent champion of Australian Aborigines' interests
- Dervorguilla of Galloway (c. 1210–1290), a 'lady of substance' in 13th-century Scotland, mother of king John I of Scotland, and founder of Sweetheart Abbey
- Alexander Donaldson (1727–1794), appellant in the copyright case, Donaldson v Beckett; founder/publisher of the Edinburgh Advertiser
- James Donaldson (1751–1830), publisher of the Edinburgh Advertiser; founder of Donaldson's Hospital
- Bill Douglas (1934–1991), film director
- The Rev. John Archibald Dunbar-Dunbar (1849–1905), philatelist, one of the "Fathers of Philately"
- Helen Duncan (1897–1956), last woman to be tried under the Witchcraft Act 1735
- William Dunlop (c. 1654–1700), Covenanter, adventurer, and Principal of the University of Glasgow
- John Fairbairn (1794–1864), newspaper proprietor, educator, financier and politician of the Cape Colony
- Sir David Ferrier (1843–1928), pioneering neurologist and psychologist
- Donald Findlay (born 1951)
- John Finlaison (1783–1860), first president of the Institute of Actuaries
- Alexander Kinloch Forbes (1821–1865), scholar of the Gujarati language
- William Forsyth (1737–1804), horticulturist, founding member of the Royal Horticultural Society, after whom the genus Forsythia is named
- Lord Fountainhall (1646–1722), one of Scotland's leading jurists
- Alexander Yule Fraser (1857–1890), mathematician, one of the founders of the Edinburgh Mathematical Society
- Jenny Geddes (c. 1600–c. 1660), market trader, threw a stool at the Dean of Edinburgh in protest against the new prayer book
- Patrick Geddes (1854–1932), biologist, sociologist, geographer, philanthropist and pioneering town planner
- Sir Andrew Gilchrist (1910–1993), diplomat
- Gilleasbaig of Menstrie (fl. 13th century), earliest attested member Campbell family, father of Sir Colin Campbell
- Ewen Gillies (born 1825), serial emigrant and adventurer from St. Kilda, Scotland
- Anna Gordon or Brown (1747–1810), ballad collector
- Robert Gordon of Straloch (1580–1661), cartographer, poet, mathematician, antiquary, and geographer
- Janet Gourlay (1863–1912) Egyptologist, born in Glasgow
- Patrick Grant (born 1972), fashion designer
- Angelica Gray (born 1990), model
- Alasdair George Hay (born 1961), first and current chief fire officer of the Scottish Fire and Rescue Service
- Robert Hay (1799–1863), traveller, antiquarian, and Egyptologist
- Amanda Hendrick (born 1990), model
- William Vallance Douglas Hodge (1903–1975), mathematician, geometer
- Isobel Hoppar (born c. 1490), landowner, governess and political figure
- John Horrocks (1816–1881), founder and innovator of modern European fly fishing
- Kirsty Hume (born 1976), model
- Sir John Ritchie Inch (1911–1993), police officer, Chief Constable of Edinburgh City Police
- David Jones (born 1966), games programmer and entrepreneur, known for creating the Grand Theft Auto video game franchise
- Princess Kaiulani Cleghorn of Hawaii (1876–1899), daughter of Archibald Cleghorn and Princess Miriam Likelike (sister of Queen Lili'iuokalani)
- Christopher Kane (born 1982), fashion designer
- Janet Keiller (fl. 1797), developer of marmalade
- James Kennedy (1930–1973), security guard for British Rail Engineering Limited, posthumously awarded the George Cross
- Mariote Ker (floruit 1529), Scottish burgess
- Simon Somerville Laurie (1829–1909), educator
- Mikhail Lermontov, 19th-century Russian author of Scottish origin
- Hercules Linton (1837–1900), surveyor, designer, shipbuilder, antiquarian and local councillor, designer of the Cutty Sark
- James Loch (1780–1855), economist, advocate, barrister, estate commissioner
- Sir Robert Hamilton Bruce Lockhart (1887–1970), diplomat, journalist and secret agent
- Mary Lyon (1797–1849), first woman principal in America
- Flora Macaulay (1859–1958), editor of The Oban Times newspaper
- Flora MacDonald (1722–1790), Jacobite and United Empire Loyalist
- Gillies MacKinnon, film director, writer and painter
- Iain Macmillan (1938–2006), photographer, took the photograph for The Beatles' album Abbey Road
- Jamie Macpherson (1675–1700), outlaw and author of MacPherson's Lament or Rant
- Dame Sarah Elizabeth Siddons Mair (1846–1941), campaigner for women's education and women's suffrage
- Gary McKinnon (born 1966), computer hacker
- Lorna McNee, chef
- Robert McQueen, Lord Braxfield (1722–1799), advocate and judge
- James Murdoch (1856–1921), journalist and teacher
- William McMaster Murdoch (1873–1912), First Officer aboard the RMS Titanic
- Keith Murray, Baron Murray of Newhaven (1903–1993), academic and Rector of Lincoln College, Oxford
- Androw Myllar (fl.1503–1508), first Scottish printer, in partnership with Walter Chepman
- Eunice Olumide (born 1987), model
- James Orrock (1829–1913), collector of art and Oriental ceramics
- Robert Paterson (1715–1801), stonemason, who suggested to Sir Walter Scott the character of "Old Mortality"
- Duncan Phyfe (1770–1854), United States most celebrated cabinetmaker
- Natalie Pike (born 1983), model
- James Pillans (1778–1864), classical scholar and educational reformer
- Allan Pinkerton (1819–1884), North American detective
- Timothy Pont (c. 1565–1614), cartographer and topographer, the first to produce a detailed map of Scotland
- John Charles Walsham Reith (1889–1971), first Director General of the BBC
- John Rennie (1842–1918), naval architect, Naval Constructor and Instructor for the Chinese Government
- Rev. Archibald "Archie" Eneas Robertson (1870–1958), generally regarded as first mountaineer to climb all 282 Munros
- Jonathan Saunders, fashion designer
- James Small (1835–1900), last laird of Dirnanean
- Archibald Smith (1813–1872), mathematician and lawyer
- William Stewart Easton Stephen (1903–1975), philatelist
- Flora Stevenson (1839–1905), social reformer, interested in education
- Louisa Stevenson (1835–1908), campaigner for women's university education, women's suffrage and well-organised nursing
- Jock Stewart (1918–1989), executioner
- Charlotte Carmichael Stopes (1840–1929), author, and campaigner for women's rights
- Marie Charlotte Carmichael Stopes (1880–1958), author, palaeobotanist and campaigner for eugenics and women's rights
- John Guthrie Tait (1861–1945), educator, principal of the Central College of Bangalore, and sportsman
- Stella Tennant (born 1970), model
- Mary Anne MacLeod Trump (1912–2000), philanthropist, mother of Donald Trump
- John Thomson (1837–1921), photographer
- James Tytler (1745–1804), apothecary, editor of the second edition of Encyclopædia Britannica; first person in Britain to fly (by ascending in a hot air balloon)
- John Walker (1731–1803), minister of religion, natural historian and professor
- Albert Watson (born 1942), fashion and celebrity photographer
- Alexander Wilson (d. 1922), noted amateur photographer, working in Dundee
- Margaret Wilson (c. 1667–1685), Covenanter martyr
- Roderick Wright (1940–2005), disgraced Catholic bishop

== See also ==
- Biographical Dictionary of Eminent Scotsmen (1857)
- List of fictional Scots
- List of women Senators of the College of Justice
- Scottish Diaspora
- Scottish Americans
- Scotch-Irish Americans
- Scottish Australians
- Scottish Argentines
- Scottish Brazilians
- Scots-Quebecer
- Scottish Canadians
- Scottish New Zealanders
