= Bernard Murphy =

Bernard Murphy may refer to:

- Bernard Murphy (footballer), Scottish footballer
- Bernard Murphy (bishop) (1918–1974), Canadian Roman Catholic bishop
- Bernard Murphy (judge), Australian judge
- Bernard D. Murphy (1841–1911), Canadian-born American politician in California
- Bernard James Elmer Murphy, abbot of Mt. Angel Abbey

== See also ==
- Bernie Murphy, Irish hurler and Gaelic footballer
