= Margaret Alexander =

Margaret Alexander may refer to:

- Margaret Walker (1915–1998) (born as Margaret Alexander), African-American poet and writer
- Margaret F. Alexander, British nursing administrator and medical professional
- Margaret Alexander, Countess Alexander of Tunis (1905–1977), born Lady Margaret Bingham
