= Robert Lumsden =

Scottish consultant ear, nose and throat (E.N.T.) surgeon

Robert Benny Lumsden TD, FRCSED (1903 – 8 October 1973) was a Scottish consultant ear, nose and throat (E.N.T.) surgeon.

== Education ==
Lumsden was educated at Strathallan School, the University of Edinburgh and for a short period at the University of Vienna. He graduated in medicine (MB, ChB) from Edinburgh in 1926 and became a Fellow of the Royal College of Surgeons of Edinburgh (FRCSED) in 1932.

== Surgeon ==
After his house appointments Lumsden joined the E.N.T. department of the Royal Infirmary of Edinburgh, where he eventually became honorary consultant. In 1928, he was appointed consultant to the E.N.T. department at Stirling Royal Infirmary and the Deaconess Hospital, Edinburgh. In 1935 he was elected a member of the Harveian Society of Edinburgh.

At the outbreak of the Second World War, Lumsden, already serving with the Officers' Training Corps, was appointed E.N.T. specialist to a field general hospital. Shortly afterward, he was appointed as consultant adviser in E.N.T. to the Middle East Force. Lumsden was promoted to captain on 11 April 1945. He retired from the Territorial Army Reserve of Officers on 17 April 1955 with the rank of lieutenant colonel. On 29 April 1955, he was awarded the Territorial Decoration (TD). Lumsden published several papers during his military career detailing some of his medical cases.

Following the end of the war, Lumsden spent time in Rome studying the treatment of Ménière's disease by destruction of the labyrinth of the inner ear by ultrasound and in Britain introduced the treatment at the experimental stage. While based at the Wilkie Surgical Research Institution at the University of Edinburgh he conducted extensive research on the effects of ultrasound on the inner ear. Lumsden retired from the Royal Infirmary, Edinburgh, in 1967.

== Publications ==
- John P Stewart; Robert B Lumsden, eds. (1961). Logan Turner's Diseases of the Nose, Throat, and Ear (6 ed.). John Wright & Sons (Bristol). ISBN 9781483195599.

In 1961 Lumsden was assistant editor on the sixth edition of Arthur Logan Turner's 1924 textbook Logan Turner's Diseases of the Nose, Throat, and Ear. In 2014, the book was on its 11th edition. A review of the sixth edition appeared in the Proceedings of the Royal Society of Medicine in March 1962.)
