= Alexander Pennecuik =

Scottish physician and poet

Alexander Pennecuik M.D. (1652–1722) was a Scottish physician and poet.

== Life ==
He was the eldest son of Alexander Pennecuik of Newhall, Edinburgh, who had been a surgeon under Johan Banér in the Thirty Years' War, and afterwards in the Scottish army of the First English Civil War in England. After foreign travel, he cared for his father, who lived to age 90.

Pennecuik was in practice as a physician in Tweeddale, and on good terms with a number of Scottish men of letters. In 1702 his elder daughter married, and Pennecuik gave with her the estate of Newhall. Her husband, however, got into debt, and in 1703 Newhall was sold to Sir David Forbes, father to John Forbes, Pennecuik's friend and Allan Ramsay's patron. Pennecuik lived at Romanno until his death in 1722. He was buried in the churchyard at Newlands, by his father's side.

== Works ==
Pennecuik published poetical pieces:

- Caledonia Triumphans, broadside, 1699, reprinted in David Laing's Various Pieces of Fugitive Scotch Poetry, 1823.
- A Panegyric to the King, broadside, 1699.
- The Tragedy of Graybeard, 1700.
- Lintoun Address to his Highness the Prince of Orange, broadside, 1714; this piece was first printed in the first part of James Watson's Choice Collection of Scots Songs, 1706.

At the request of Sir Robert Sibbald, who was writing about the counties of Scotland, Pennecuik wrote a description of Tweeddale with his friend the advocate John Forbes of Newhall; it appeared as A Geographical, Historical Description of the Shire of Tweeddale, with a Miscellany and curious Collection of Select Scottish Poems (1715). Pennecuik corresponded with the botanist James Sutherland. Pennecuik's works were reprinted at Edinburgh in 1762, as A Collection of curious Scots Poems … by Alexander Pennecuik; at Leith in 1815, with notes; and again at Edinburgh in 1875. The poems are sometimes in Scottish dialect.

He has been confused with another Alexander Pennecuik (died 1730), said to be his nephew, a writer of verse.

== Notes ==
Attribution

This article incorporates text from a publication now in the public domain: Lee, Sidney, ed. (1895). "Pennecuik, Alexander". Dictionary of National Biography. Vol. 44. London: Smith, Elder & Co.
