= Alexander Pennycuik =

Alexander Pennycuik (or Pennecuick) (1605-1695) was a Scottish military surgeon who became Surgeon General of the Scots forces in Ireland during the English Civil War. He was elected Deacon (President) of the Incorporation of Surgeons and Barbers of Edinburgh

== Early life ==
Alexander Pennycuik was born in 1605, a member of a landowning family, which owned the estate of Penicuik, just south of Edinburgh. When he inherited the estate of Romanno, north of Peebles in 1647, he sold the family estate of Penicuik and bought the New Hall estate on the southern borders of Midlothian. In the minutes of the Royal College of Surgeons of Edinburgh he is often referred to as Alexander Pennycuik of New Hall.

== Career ==
Like many Scots, he felt drawn to serve in the Thirty Years War. He was surgeon under General Johan Banér who led one of the armies of Queen Christina, the daughter of Gustavus Adolphus. He was admitted to the Incorporation of Surgeons and Barbers of Edinburgh in 1640 in consideration of his "literature and qualifications" and on the payment of the sum of £200 Scots. He spent much of his life as a military surgeon in Scotland and Ireland, becoming Surgeon General of the Scots forces in Ireland during the English Civil War. In 1650 he was placed in charge of the wounded left behind in Stirling castle. For these many years of service he claimed to have been paid a meagre £165 sterling. Furthermore his loyalty to the Crown over this period had resulted in the loss of his land, which was plundered by the Parliamentarian Army. After the war in 1663 he petitioned Parliament for £3668 sterling which he reckoned was the balance due to him for services as a military surgeon.

Like most surgeons of his day he also acted as an apothecary and indeed took legal action against the father of a patient for non-payment of fees after he had treated the patient for scrofula (tuberculosis) 'with all kinds of inward and outward medicines'.

He was Deacon (President) of the Incorporation of Surgeons and Barbers of Edinburgh between 1644 and 1646.

== Later years and family ==
Despite spending most of his working life as a surgeon in conflicts, he went on to live to about 90. In his later years he was cared for by his son Alexander Pennycuik (or Pennecuick) (1652–1722) who had qualified and practised as a physician but found fame as a poet and naturalist. His estate of New Hall was thought to be the setting for 'The Gentle Shepherd', Allan Ramsay's celebrated pastoral poem.

His son, in a fond posthumous tribute, described his father as:

"The oldest Aesculapian of his age…

Who flattered not the rich nor scourged the poor

From old forebears much worth he did inherit

A gentleman by birth but more by merit"

He was buried in the churchyard at Kirkurd/Newlands Parish Church near Peebles.
