= J. A. Dunbar-Dunbar =

British philatelist

The Rev. John Archibald Dunbar-Dunbar (8 October 1849 – 11 November 1905) was a British philatelist who was one of the "Fathers of Philately" entered on the Roll of Distinguished Philatelists in 1921. He was an expert in the stamps of Australia.

== Early life ==
Dunbar-Dunbar was born on 8 October 1849 at Seapark, Forres, Morayshire, Scotland, the son of Edward Dunbar-Dunbar, a captain in the 21st Fusiliers, and Phoebe Dunbar (died 1899 leaving £109,808). He received his university education at Oxford, graduating with a B.A. degree in 1873.

== Clerical career ==
On 5 November 1875 at Warwick he married Louisa Cambray and by 1875 he was Assistant Curate at St. Salvador's Church, Dundee where he was subsequently ordained as a priest in 1876. In April 1878 he became the curate at St. Margaret's Episcopal Church, Lochee, Dundee.

== Death ==
The Reverend died in 1905 and left estate valued at £151,192. His stamps were left to the Museum of Science and Art in Edinburgh. He also left a bequest to benefit 10 poor persons in the Findhorn area aged 65 and upwards, which must have been sizeable at the time, but is now only about £4000.
