= Angelica Gray =

Scottish model

- Born: 28 June 1990 (age 36); Glasgow, Scotland
- Occupation: Fashion model
- Modeling information
- Height: 1.755 m (5 ft 9 in)
- Hair color: Blonde
- Eye color: Blue
- Agency: Hughes Models

Angelica Gray (born 28 June 1990 in Glasgow, Scotland) is a Scottish plus-size model, actress and spokeswoman for the promotion of a healthier and more diverse selection of women within the fashion industry. Gray's grandmother Barbara Sinclair Thomson was a model for French fashion house Dior in the 1940s and 1950s. Gray has modelled for Vogue Italia, Elena Miro and Marina Rinaldi. She has appeared on BBC Radio and in many national and international editorial publications.
