= Neil McMenemy =

Scottish former triple jumper

Neil McMenemy (1967-2025, born Inverness, Scotland) was Scotland's national triple jump champion twice during the 1990s. The Scottish Association of Track Statisticians report that he has made the most appearances for Scotland at indoor internationals by a male athlete (seven appearances (four wins) at triple jump and two at long jump). Analysis provided by the Scottish Association of Track Statisticians in April 2017 shows that he has made the most appearances for Scotland at triple jump in international competition (15 appearances); more than any other athlete, male or female.

He graduated from the University of Edinburgh with a BSc(Eng) in Chemical Engineering in 1988, and pursued a long and successful career in IT.

== Sporting career ==
Neil competed for Central Athletic Club (formerly Central Region Athletic Club) for 20 years from 1977 to 1997 and up to December 2010 held the club records for long jump and triple jump both indoor and out. He also competed for the British Athletics League Division One club Newham and Essex Beagles Neil made his debut for Scotland in 1990 in Kapfenberg, Austria in the Westathletic Cup against the Netherlands, Belgium, Austria, Switzerland, Ireland, Spain and Portugal. He continued to compete for Scotland both at home and abroad (including, Tel Aviv, Hamar and Istanbul) winning the bronze medal in the Istanbul Games in 1994.

His last performance for Scotland was a first place in the Small Nations Cup in Belfast in 1996 against Northern Ireland, Ireland, Wales and Turkey.

Neil was only the third man, after coach, Rodger Harkins and world record holder, Jonathan Edwards to win Scottish national titles at triple jump indoor and out. He was also the first to hold both titles simultaneously. He won two titles indoor (1994 and 1996) and two titles outdoor (1995 and 1996).

His best performances came at the CAU Championships where in 1990 he won the silver medal behind 1994 Commonwealth Games gold medallist Julian Golley and in 1994 where he achieved his lifetime best of 15.13m, the same year in which John Mackenzie set the current Scottish record of 16.17m.

Neil became the Scottish Athletics national event coach for triple jump in 2003 and continued in this position until 2006. During this time he helped Scottish long jump record holder Darren Ritchie to his first and only national triple jump title in 2005. The next year he coached 18-year-old John Carr to the same title. Under his direction Carr also won the junior indoor AAA long jump title in 2006. Carr achieved a senior UK top 10 triple jump ranking in 2006.

He took part in the scottishathletics interim coaching commission to re-establish the commission as a body capable of representing coaches in Scotland.

At age 28 Neil played rugby union, mostly on the wing, for Forrester FP for a season. He was also invited to play for Edinburgh Borderers RFC where he scored 5 tries in winning the Gracie Cup at the Alloa sevens tournament in 1997. The same year he was included in the initial Scotland Amateur Rugby League squad but could not take part due to business commitments.

Neil is the third cousin, once removed of the Scotland footballer and member of Hibernian's The Famous Five, Bobby Johnstone. His first cousin is rugby referee Andrew McMenemy.

== International Appearance summary ==
(Note match winners in bold)

Representing Scotland Under 20

- 1986 Edinburgh, Scotland - Scotland U20 v Wales U20 v **England U20** v Northern Ireland U20 (7th/8)

Representing Scotland

- 1990 Kapfenberg, Austria – Scotland v Austria v Switzerland, v Netherlands v Belgium v **Spain** v Portugal v Ireland (7th/8)
- 1990 Mosfellsbær, Iceland – **Scotland** v Iceland v Ireland (2nd/6 – 1st B/3)
- 1991 Glasgow, Scotland (Indoor) - **Scotland** v Northern Ireland (1st/10)
- 1991 RAF Cosford, England (Indoor) - **Scotland** v Wales (11th/12)
- 1991 Grangemouth, Scotland – **Scotland** v Wales v Northern Ireland v Ireland v Iceland (4th/5)
- 1992 Hamar, Norway (Indoor) – Scotland v **Norway** v Denmark v Norway U23 (4th/4)
- 1992 Tel Aviv, Israel – Scotland v Israel v **Wales** v Turkey (4th/4)
- 1992 Glasgow, Scotland (Indoor) – **Scotland** v Northern Ireland (1st A/10 TJ and 3rd A/10 LJ)
- 1993 Glasgow, Scotland (Indoor) – **Scotland** v Wales (1st/4)
- 1993 Glasgow, Scotland (Indoor) – **Scotland** v Northern Ireland (1st/10 TJ and 2nd/10 LJ)
- 1993 Wrexham, Wales – **Scotland** v Wales v Northern Ireland (5th/7 - 2nd B/4)
- 1994 Birmingham, England – **Scotland** v Wales (3rd A/12)
- 1994 Glasgow, Scotland (Indoor) – **Scotland** v Wales (1st/4, 1st A/2)
- 1994 Istanbul, Turkey – Scotland v **Turkey** v Israel v Wales (3rd/4)
- 1995 Cardiff, Wales – Scotland (Team Captain) v Wales v Northern Ireland v **Turkey** (3rd/4)
- 1996 Belfast, Northern Ireland – **Scotland** v Northern Ireland v Wales v Ireland v Turkey (1st/5)

== Total Appearances against Opposing Nations ==
Triple Jump and Long Jump (bolded appearances indicates beating the opponent)
Opponent	1990	1991	1992	1993	1994	1995	1996	Total Appearances	Notes
Wales		2	1	**1**	**3**	**1**	**1**	9 (**6**)	All TJ
Northern Ireland		2 (**1** 1)	3 (**2** 1)	3 (**2** 1)		1	**1**	9 (**5**)	7 TJ and 2 LJ
Ireland	**2**	1					**1**	4 (**3**)	All TJ
Iceland	**1**	**1**						2 (**2**)	All TJ
Turkey			1			1	**1**	3 (**1**)	All TJ
Israel			1		1			2	All TJ
Norway			1					1	All TJ
Denmark			1					1	All TJ
Spain	1							1	All TJ
Portugal	1							1	All TJ
Switzerland	1							1	All TJ
Austria	1							1	All TJ
Belgium	1							1	All TJ
Netherlands	1							1	All TJ
