= Alexander Keith Johnston (1844–1879) =

Scottish explorer, cartographer and geographer

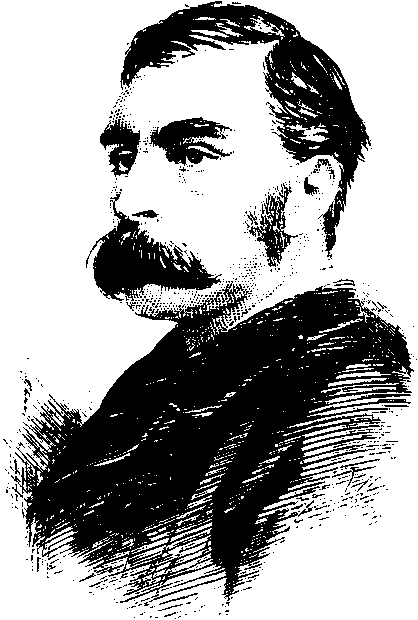
Keith Johnston

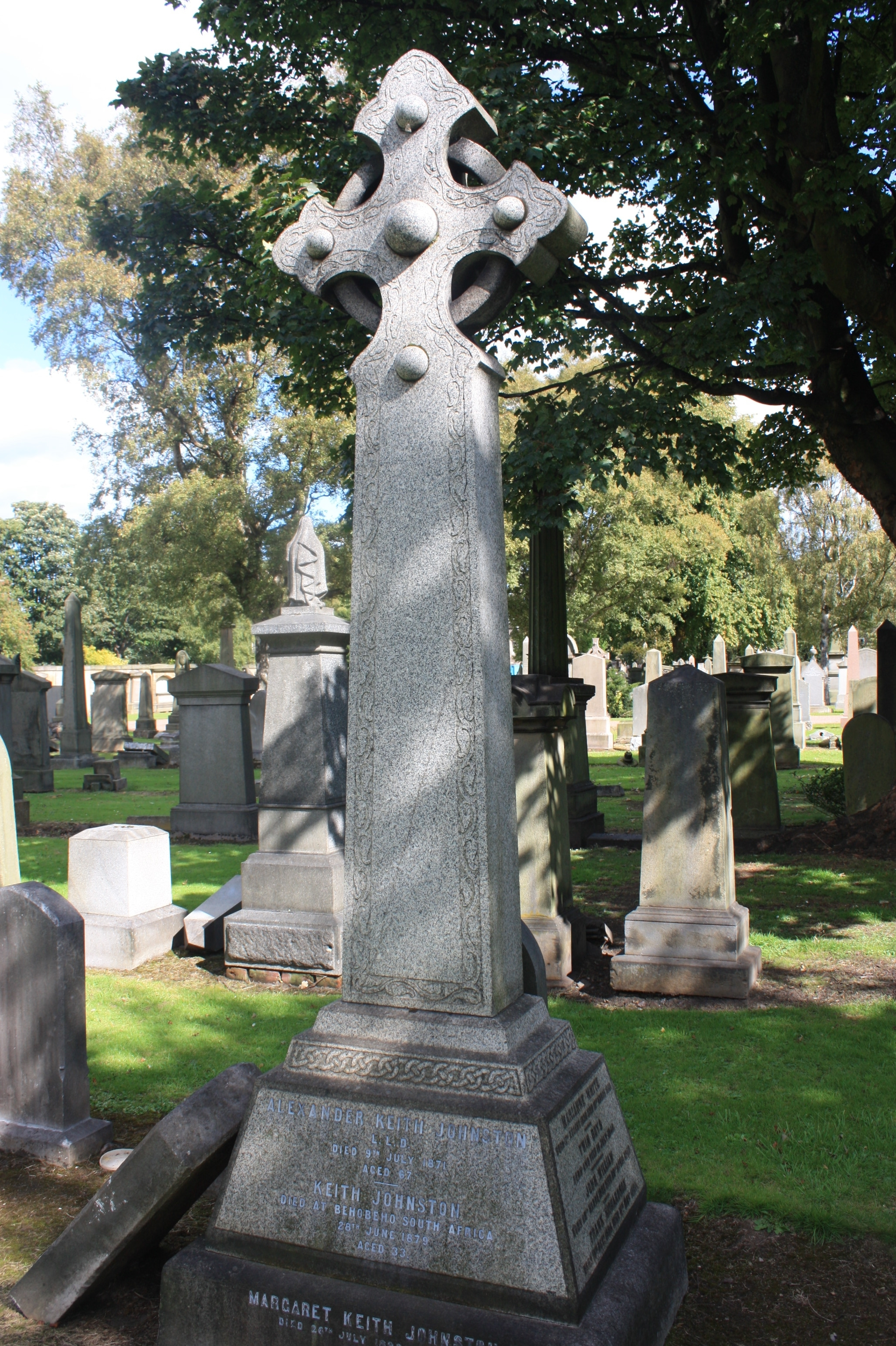
Memorial to Alexander Keith Johnston, Grange Cemetery

Alexander Keith Johnston (24 November 1844 – 28 June 1879) was a Scottish explorer, cartographer and geographer. He was the son of published geographer Alexander Keith Johnston and Mary Grey.

From 1873 to 1875, he was geographer to a commission for the survey of Paraguay. He led a Royal Geographical Society expedition to Lake Nyasa and Lake Tanganyika in Central Africa. Six weeks into the expedition, Johnston died from malaria and dysentery in the village of Beho Beho in what is now the Selous Game Reserve, Tanzania . He was accompanied by the explorer, geologist and fellow Scot Joseph Thomson who successfully completed the expedition.

Several expeditions were conducted by * Mike Shand (University of Glasgow) to find the grave of Keith Johnston between 2001 and 2004. The grave searches have been documented in a chapter of the book *Wild Heart of Africa - The Selous Game Reserve in Tanzania, edited by Rolf Baldus and published by Rowland Ward in 2009. He is memorialised on his father's grave in Grange Cemetery in Edinburgh.
