= Bernie Murphy =

Irish hurler and Gaelic footballer

Personal information
- Native name: Beircheart Ó Murchú (Irish)
- Born: 1923 Cork, Ireland

Sport
- Football Position: Centre-back
- Hurling Position: Midfield
Club
- Years: Club
- St Finbarr's
Club titles
	Football	Hurling
Cork titles	0	3
Inter-county*
Years	County	Apps (scores)
1943-1949 1948-1949	Cork (hurling); Cork (football)	7 (1-6); 4 (0-00)
Inter-county titles
	Football	Hurling
Munster Titles	1	1
All-Ireland Titles	0	1
League titles	0	1
- *Inter County team apps and scores correct as of 23:33, 29 July 2014.

Bernie Murphy (1923 - 12 January 2002) was an Irish hurler and Gaelic footballer who played as a midfielder at senior level for the Cork county hurling team.

Born in Cork, Murphy first arrived on the inter-county scene at the age of twenty when he first linked up with the Cork senior hurling team. He made his debut during the 1942 championship before later joining the Cork senior football team. Murphy immediately became a regular member of the starting fifteen and won one All-Ireland medal, one Munster medal and one National Hurling League medal with the hurlers as well as one Munster medal with the footballers.

At club level Murphy was a three-time championship medallist with St Finbarr's.

Throughout his career Murphy made a combined total of 11 championship appearances. His retirement came following the conclusion of the 1949 championships.
