= Douglas Mary McKain =

Nurse, midwife, businesswoman

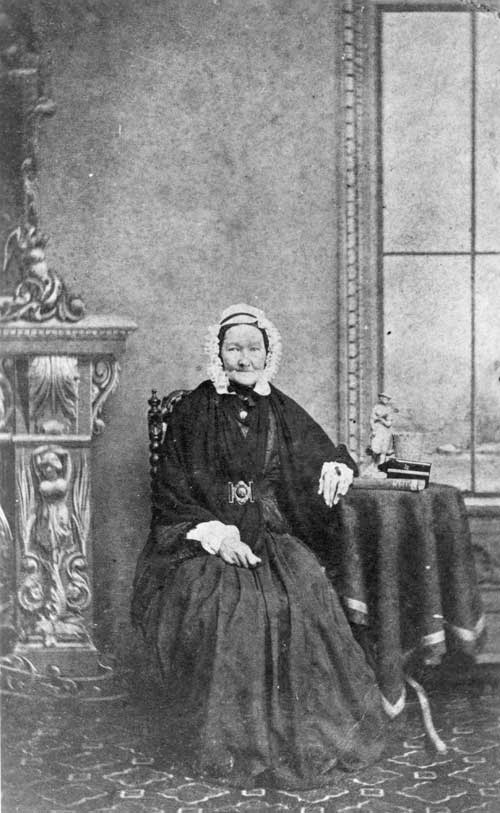
Douglas Mary McKain (1789 – 1873)

Douglas Mary McKain (20 July 1789 – 3 April 1873) was a New Zealand nurse, midwife and businesswoman. She was born Douglas Mary Dunsmore in Glasgow, Lanarkshire, Scotland on 20 July 1789 and died 3 April 1873 in Napier. She arrived in New Zealand as a widow, accompanied by four sons and a daughter, on the ship Olympus, which arrived in Port Nicholson (Wellington) in April 1841.
