= Mike Zagorski =

Scottish road racing cyclist (born 1979)

Personal information
- Full name: Mike Zagorski
- Born: 15 June 1979 (age 47) Inverness, Scotland.
- Height: 5 ft 10 in (1.78 m)
- Weight: 140 lb (64 kg)

Cycling career
- Sport: Cycling
- Current team: BME Hawai'i Racing Team
- Discipline: Cycling
- Role: Cyclist
- Rider type: Amateur Road & Track Racer

Amateur teams
- 1996-1997: Clachnacuddin Cycling Club
- 1998: Titanium Red
- 1999: DNA / Linda McCartney
- 2000-2002: Team Carbon 5 / Bike Shed
- 2003: Cambiamento d'Andaturo
- 2004: Velo Ecosse
- 2006: Velo Club La Grange Westwood
- 2007: QuickRelease
- 2008: Pacific Velo - IT&B/
- 2009-: BME Racing Team

Mike Zagorski (born 15 June 1979 in Inverness, Scotland) is a Scottish road racing cyclist. Zagorski represented Scotland in the UK National Points Series (Mountain Bike racing) in 1996-1998.

== Palmarès ==
2005 – Unattached
1st Hawaii State Road Race Championship
1st Hawaii State Criterium Championship
1st Hawaii State Time Trial Championship
1st Cycle to the Sun (hill climb) 10,000ft / 36 miles

2006 – QuickRelease
1st Hawaii State Criterium Championship
1st Hawaii State Time Trial Championship
1st Cycle to the Sun (hillclimb) 10,000ft / 36 miles
1st Sea to Stars (hillclimb) 9130ft / 36 miles
1st Hawaii Cycling Cup Overall General Classification
1st Tantalus Time Trial (hill climb)
KoM Dick Evans Memorial Road Race
7th Stage 2 - Mt Hood Cycling Classic

2007 – QuickRelease
1st Hawaii State Criterium Championship
1st Hawaii State Time Trial Championship
1st Aloha State Games Road Race
1st Tantalus Time Trial (hill climb)
KoM Dick Evans Memorial Road Race

2008 – Pacific Velo - IT&B
1st Hawaii State Time Trial Championship
1st Castle To Hanauma Time Trial
1st Makaha Time Trial
1st Tantalus Time Trial

starting 2009 to present – BME Racing Team

(For the results see the races below).

== Records ==
- 2005 Hawaii State Time Trial (Malaekahana) 54 min 9 s
- 2006 Tantalus Time Trial (hill climb, Honolulu, HI, USA) 18 min 29 s
- 2006 Sea to Stars (hill climb, Hilo to Mauna Kea, Big Island, HI, USA) 2 h 26 min 43 s
- 2008 Hawaii State Time Trial (Malaekahana) 53 min 37 s (record at the time)
