= James Macpherson (outlaw) =

Scottish outlaw

- Born: c. 1675; Scotland
- Died: 16 November 1700 (aged 24–25); Banff, Scotland
- Occupation: Robber
- Criminal charges: Robbery; Bearing arms in a market Being a Gypsy
- Penalty: Death by hanging

James Macpherson (c. 1675–1700) was a Scottish outlaw, famed for his lament before execution. He grew up a talented swordsman and fiddle player, then became leader of a gang of robbers. He was arrested in Keith and died in Banff. The lament was rewritten by Robert Burns as McPherson's Farewell.

== Early life ==
James Macpherson was born c. 1675 the illegitimate son of a Clan Macpherson laird from Invereshie, Inverness-shire and a woman who was either Romani or a Traveller. He was brought up at Invereshie House then after his father died prematurely, he lived with his itinerant mother.

== Outlaw ==
MacPherson grew up a talented swordsman and fiddle player, who formed a gang that robbed the rich lairds of the Province of Moray and gave to the poor, making him a Robin Hood figure. In 1609, the Parliament of Scotland passed an "Act Anent the Egiptians" (Act Against the Egyptians; at the time, Romani were widely believed to be itinerant Egyptians, hence the term "Gypsy"). This act made it lawful to condemn, detain and execute Romani people; as a result, Macpherson lived as a criminal as soon as he joined his mother. Furthermore, he had angered a local land-owner, William Duff of Braco, who wanted to stop the robberies. Macpherson was captured in Aberdeen but then managed to escape from prison with the help of his family.

After an aggressive confrontation in September 1700 with Duff's men at the St Rufus Fair in Keith, Macpherson fled but fell over a gravestone and was detained. He was taken to Banff for trial under the 1609 act with three other outlaws; he was found guilty alongside his comrade James Gordon and both were sentenced to death by hanging.

== Death and legacy ==
Whilst awaiting execution, Macpherson composed his Rant which he performed when he was taken to the gallows at the mercat cross on 16 November 1700. This lament inspired Robert Burns to write the famous poem McPherson’s Farewell. Macpherson then broke his fiddle and was hanged. A popular story relates that Macpherson's mother was able to obtain a reprieve for him in Turriff, but Duff set the time on the Banff town clock forward by 15 minutes so that the execution had already taken place by the time the messenger arrived by horse.

Macpherson's fame grew after J. G. Phillips released a sympathetic biography in 1894 entitled James MacPherson: The Highland freebooter. His smashed fiddle is on display at the museum of Clan Macpherson in Newtonmore, near Kingussie. His claymore and targe were held at Duff House in Banff, now his sword is also in Newtonmore. In Banff he is remembered by the name of the Broken Fiddle cafe.
