= Mariote Ker =

Mariote Ker (floruit 1529) was a Scottish burgess.

Kerr was appointed to the position of burgess of Dundee on the recommendation of King James V of Scotland on 12 November 1529. She was the first of her sex to have this position in Scotland, and the only one in Dundee until 360 years later.
