= David Wilkie (surgeon) =

British surgeon (1882–1938)

Sir David Wilkie OBE FRSE
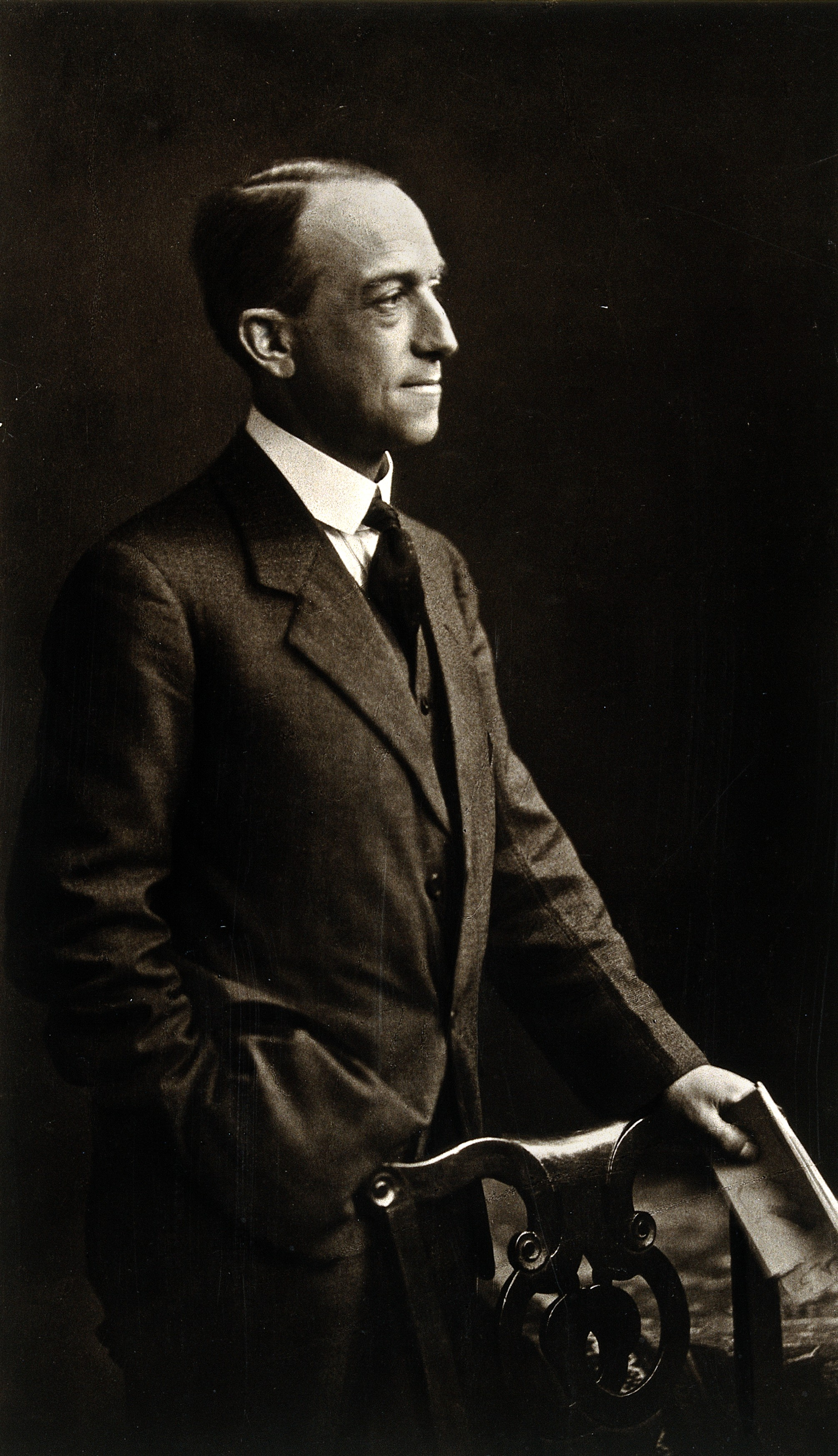
- Sir David Wilkie. Credit: Wellcome Collection
- Born: 5 November 1882
- Died: 28 August 1938 (aged 55)
- Known for: surgery
- Scientific career
- Fields: medicine
- Workplaces: University of Edinburgh

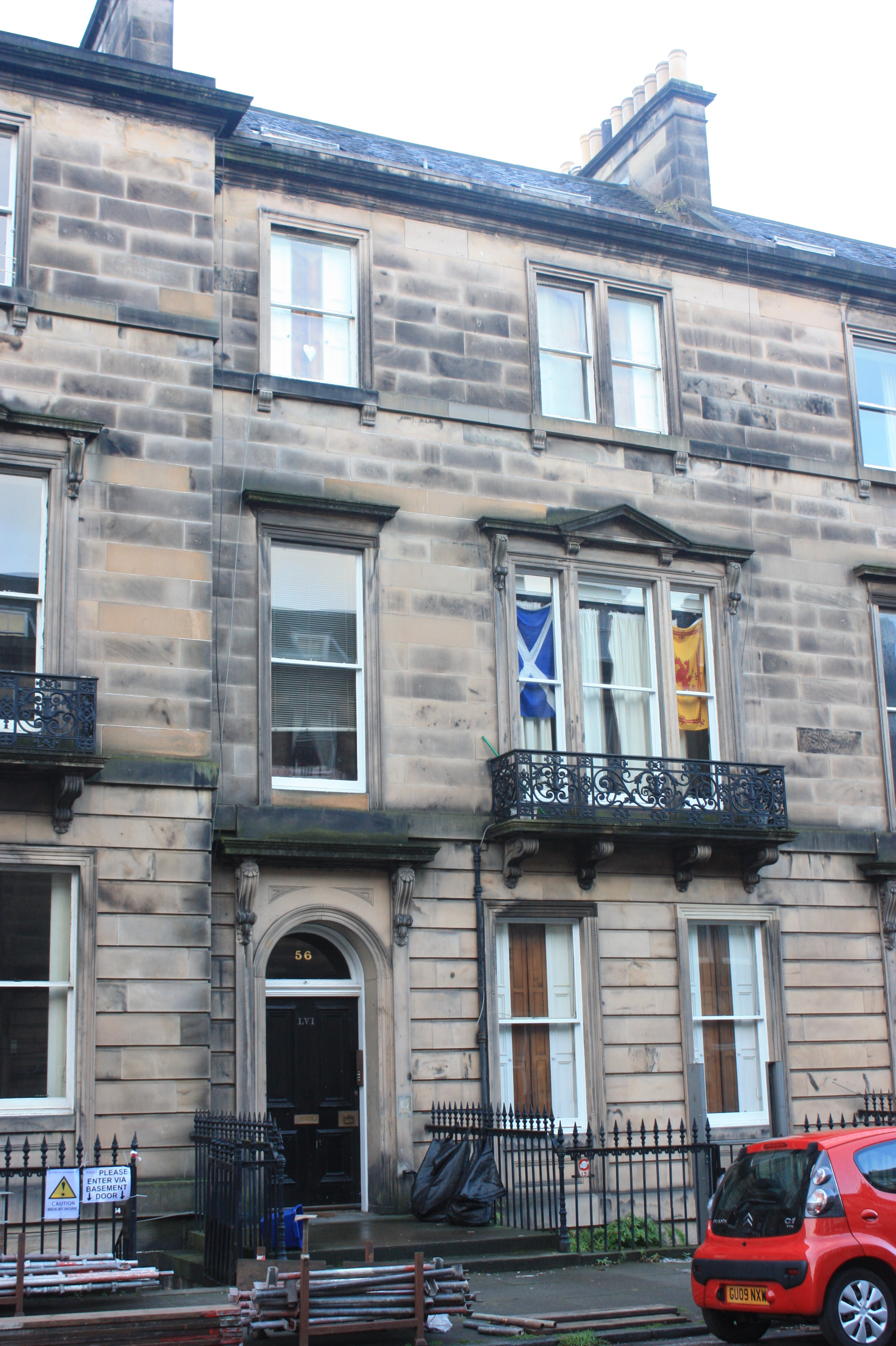
Wilkie's home at 56 Manor Place, Edinburgh

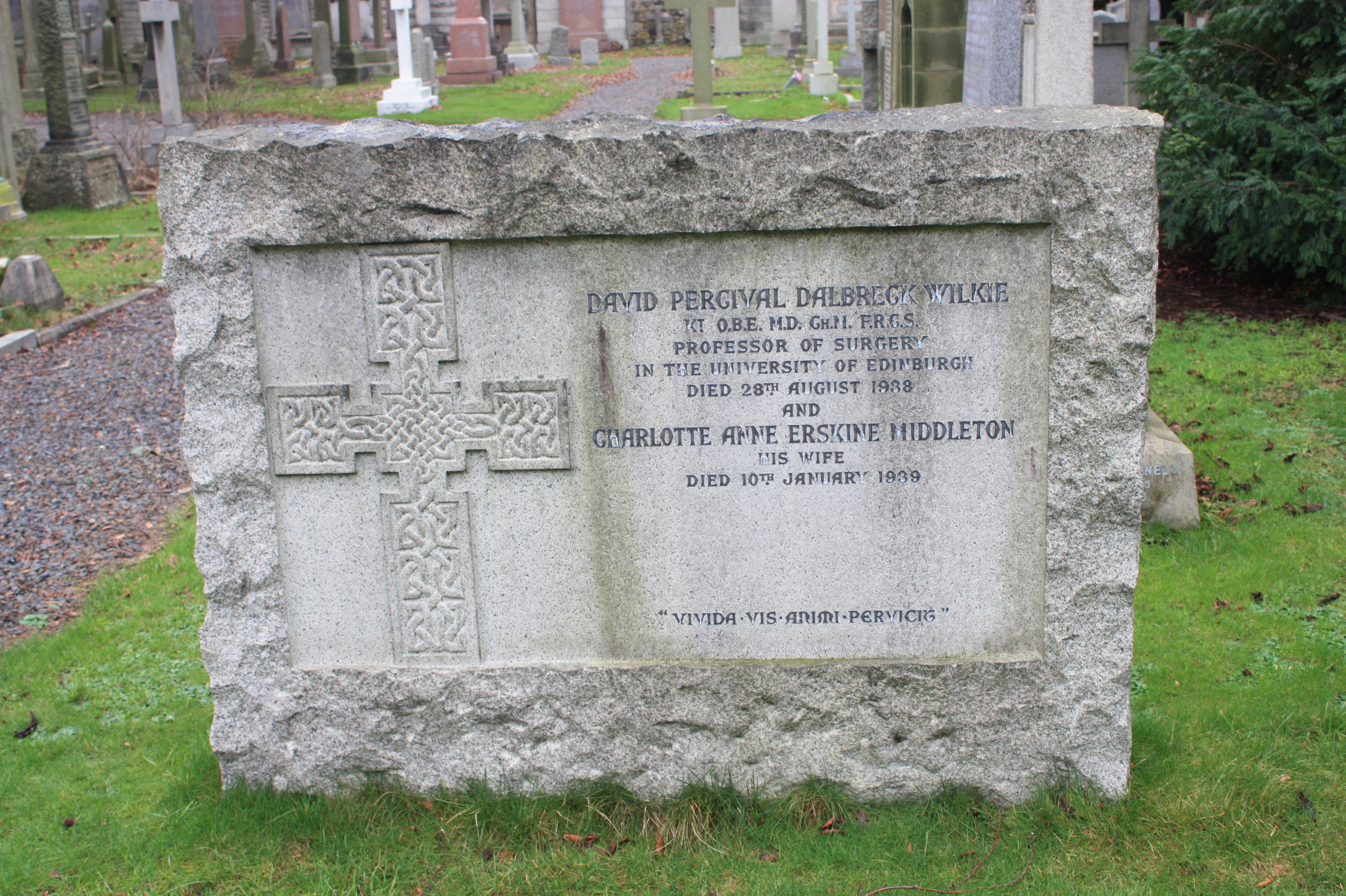
The grave of Prof David Wilkie, Dean Cemetery, Edinburgh

Sir David Percival Dalbreck Wilkie, OBE, FRSE (5 November 1882 – 28 August 1938), known to friends and colleagues as DPD, was among the first of the new breed of professors of surgery appointed at a relatively young age to develop surgical research and undergraduate teaching. At the University of Edinburgh, he established a surgical research laboratory from which was to emerge a cohort of young surgical researchers destined to become the largest dynasty of surgical professors yet seen in the British Isles. He is widely regarded as the father of British academic surgery.

== Early life ==
Wilkie was born on 5 November 1882 in Kirriemuir, the second son of David Wilkie, a wealthy jute manufacturer and his wife Margaret Lawson Mill. He attended Edinburgh Academy 1896 to 1899 and then studied medicine at Edinburgh University graduating MB ChB in 1904, and being given his doctorate (MD) in 1908.

== Professional career ==
Wilkie was initially employed from 1910 as a surgeon at Leith Hospital, in the harbour area of Edinburgh, and in 1912 moved to Edinburgh Royal Infirmary, as House Surgeon under Harold Stiles. On 26 April 1913, he was commissioned as a surgeon in the Royal Naval Volunteer Reserve (RNVR). During the First World War, he served on the hospital ship St Margaret of Scotland, first in the Mediterranean and then in Salonika. He had been promoted to surgeon lieutenant commander by the end of the war.

Following the war, in 1924 he was appointed professor of systematic surgery at Edinburgh University, in place of Prof Alexis Thomson, and held this post until death. In 1925, he was elected a Fellow of the Royal Society of Edinburgh (FRSE): his proposers were James Lorrain Smith, Arthur Robertson Cushny, George Barger, and David Murray Lyon. He was also elected a member of the Harveian Society of Edinburgh. In 1934 he was elected a member of the Aesculapian club. In the 1936 New Year Honours, he was appointed a Knight Bachelor and therefore granted the title sir. In 1936, he served as President to the Association of Surgeons of Great Britain and Ireland.

== Personal life ==
In July 1911, Wilkie married Charlotte Anne Erskine Middleton (died 1939), daughter of Dr James Middleton of Stow. They had no children. They lived at 56 Manor Place in Edinburgh's West End (previously the home of Henry Cotterill).

In 1930, when J. M. Barrie became Chancellor of the University of Edinburgh, the common root in Kirriemuir between Wilkie and Barrie brought them together as friends.

He was Vice President of the British Empire Cancer Campaign. Ironically, he died of stomach cancer whilst on a trip to London on 28 August 1938, aged only 55, and is buried on a prominent corner of the northern Victorian extension to Dean Cemetery in western Edinburgh.
