= Bernard Murphy (footballer) =

Scottish footballer

Personal information
- Full name: Bernard Murphy
- Place of birth: Scotland
- Position: Winger

Senior career*
Years	Team	Apps	(Gls)
- Duntocher Hibernian
1905–1906	Burnley	6	(2)
- * Club domestic league appearances and goals

Bernard Murphy was a Scottish professional footballer who played as a winger. In the 1905–06 season, he played six matches in the English Football League for Burnley, scoring two goals.
