= Margaret F. Alexander =

Scottish nurse, educator, researcher and writer

Margaret Forbes Alexander CBE FRCN is a Scottish nurse, educator, researcher and writer. She is emeritus professor at the School of Nursing and Community Health at Glasgow Caledonian University (GCU).

She began her nursing career as a student nurse at The Royal Infirmary of Edinburgh. In 1980, she received a Ph.D. from the University of Edinburgh for her thesis on “Nurse education". She went on to head GCU's Department of Nursing and Community Health until 1996. She was made a Fellow of the Royal College of Nursing in 1992.

The University awarded her an honorary Doctor of Science in 2000, the University of Dundee awarded her an honorary LLD (Doctor of Laws) in 2001, she became an emeritus professor in the School of Nursing, Midwifery and Community Health, Glasgow Caledonian University in 2003, received an honorary DSc Queen Margaret University College, Edinburgh in 2005 and received an honoris causa from The University of Edinburgh in 2016, the year they celebrated 60 years of Nursing as a graduating subject.

In 1999, she was named as chairman of National Board for Nursing, Midwifery and Health Visiting for Scotland. She is most widely known for co-editing Nursing Practice: Hospital and Home, a textbook that became the 'bible' for many student nurses. Under new editors now this has been retitled Alexander's Nursing Practice.

== Bibliography (author or co-author) ==
- Nursing Practice: Hospital and Home - The Adult: Hospital and Home
- Icn Framework of Competencies for the Generalist Nurse: Report of the Development Process and Consultation: Standards and competencies series (
- Nursing Partnership: A Model for Nursing Practice ()
- Reflections and Thoughts from My Heart ()
- Adult Branch Nurse for Life: Pack 1 ()
- Adult Nursing Value Pack ()
- Nursing Practice: Hospital and Home - The Adult ()
- Alexander's Nursing Practice
