= John MacDonald of Garth =

Scottish-Canadian participant in the Pemmican war

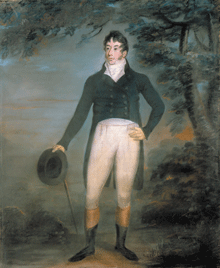
- Born: 1771; Garth, near Callander, Perthshire
- Died: January 25, 1866 (aged 94–95); Williamstown, Glengarry County

John MacDonald of Garth (1771 – 25 January 1866) was a colourful character involved in the Canadian fur trade. He was an enthusiastic duellist and a shrewd businessman who became a partner in the North West Company and a member of the Beaver Club at Montreal, Lower Canada. In an account of his exploits, he was described as having "indomitable courage... brave, reckless and domineering, with a decided tendency to seek redress with his own hands," characteristics that made him well-suited to his profession. Built in 1816, his home, Inverarden House, near Cornwall, Upper Canada, was later designated a National Historic Site of Canada. According to the 1997 book Lords of the North, by James McDonell and Robert Campbell, the Hotel Macdonald in Edmonton, Alberta was named for him.

== Early life ==
MacDonald was born in 1771 at Garth, his family's estate east of Loch Lomond, near Callander, Perthshire. He was the son of Captain John MacDonald of Garth, of the 8th King's Regiment, whose grandfather was a son of Alastair MacDonald, 10th Chief of Clan MacDonald of Keppoch. His mother, Magdalen Small, was the daughter of James Small, factor of the forfeited Struan estates in Perthshire. MacDonald's mother was a niece of Major-General John Small and Alexander Small, two of the first cousins of General John Robertson Reid, 15th Baron Reid. MacDonald himself was a brother of The Hon. Archibald Macdonald. One of his sisters, Helen, married their first cousin General Sir Archibald Campbell, 1st Baronet. His other sister, Magdalen, married The Hon. William McGillivray, of Chateau St. Antoine, Montreal, Quebec.

MacDonald was small in stature and handicapped since childhood by a withered right arm which led to him being known as Le Bras Croche among his Voyageurs, which prevented him from following the family tradition of a military career. Nonetheless, he enjoyed combat. He fought many duels and in Canada always carried on his person a sword and a pair of pistols. On the advice of his mother's uncle, Major-General Small, MacDonald sailed with Simon McTavish from Scotland to Canada in 1791 to take up employment as a clerk in the North West Company, under the tutelage of Angus Shaw.

== Fur Trade ==
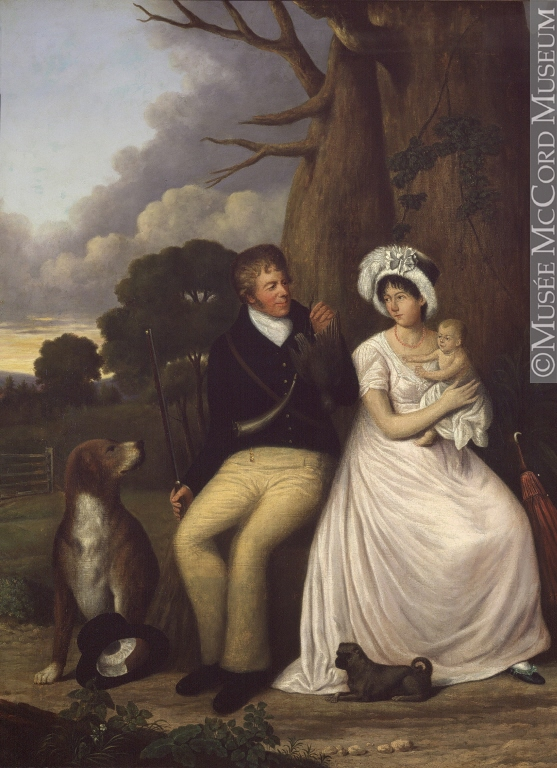
MacDonald's sister, Magdalen, and her husband William McGillivray at Chateau St. Antoine, Montreal, in 1806

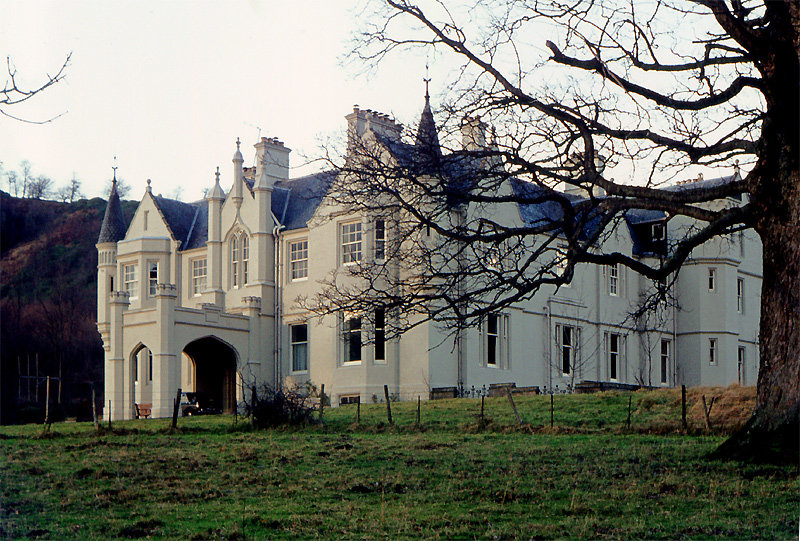
Garth House, Fortingall, the home of MacDonald's sister, Helen, and her husband (their first cousin), Sir Archibald Campbell

Under Shaw, MacDonald was in charge of the building of Fort Augustus near Edmonton, Alberta, in 1795 and of Rocky Mountain House, Alberta, in 1799. In 1800, he was made a wintering partner of the North West Company and two years later he replaced Shaw at Fort des Prairies (Augustus), the headquarters of the largest department in the north. In 1803–04, he visited relatives in London where he had his portrait done. In 1805, he established New Chesterfield House and continued to spend his winters in the north until 1808 when he fell ill. Returning to Montreal, he stayed with his sister, Magdalen, and her husband William McGillivray at Chateau St. Antoine, one of the early estates of the Golden Square Mile. That same year he was elected to the Beaver Club, where he ran up a huge entertainment bill.

Returning to the north in the spring of 1809, he shared the charge of the Red River Department and possibly helped to establish Fort Gibraltar. Two years later, he carried supplies to his friend and brother-in-law, the explorer David Thompson, in the Kootenay Ranges.

== War of 1812 ==
On the outbreak of the War of 1812, MacDonald sought support from the Government of the United Kingdom for an assault the principal fur trading station of the Pacific Fur Company, Fort Astoria. This venture was funded by John Jacob Astor as a subsidiary of the American Fur Company to compete against the NWC in the Oregon Country. At Portsmouth, he offered a lucrative contract to a young woman, Jane Barnes, to sail with him to the Columbia and become the first white woman on the North Pacific coast. MacDonald and his men sailed up to the Pacific Ocean via Cape Horn and the Juan Fernández Islands. In 1813, MacDonald and his Nor’Westers landed at Fort Astoria, finding it already in the possession of the NWC. Many employees of the Pacific Fur Company signed on to work under the NWC. Despite having been badly burned in an explosion at sea, MacDonald took charge of the new post where he stayed until the spring of 1814. Along with those PFC employees uninterested in working for the NWC, MacDonald led a brigade of about 90 men in ten canoes for Fort William.

== Pemmican War ==
MacDonald and his men arrived at Red River while Miles Macdonell, Governor of the Red River Colony, was attempting to prevent the Nor'Westers from living off country provisions, which became known as the Pemmican War. Having to expensively import supplies from Montreal, the Nor'Westers prepared to destroy the Red River Colony that had been established by Lord Selkirk. MacDonald negotiated a peace, but the NWC partners criticized the deal at the next board meeting and disavowed it.

== Family and Inverarden ==
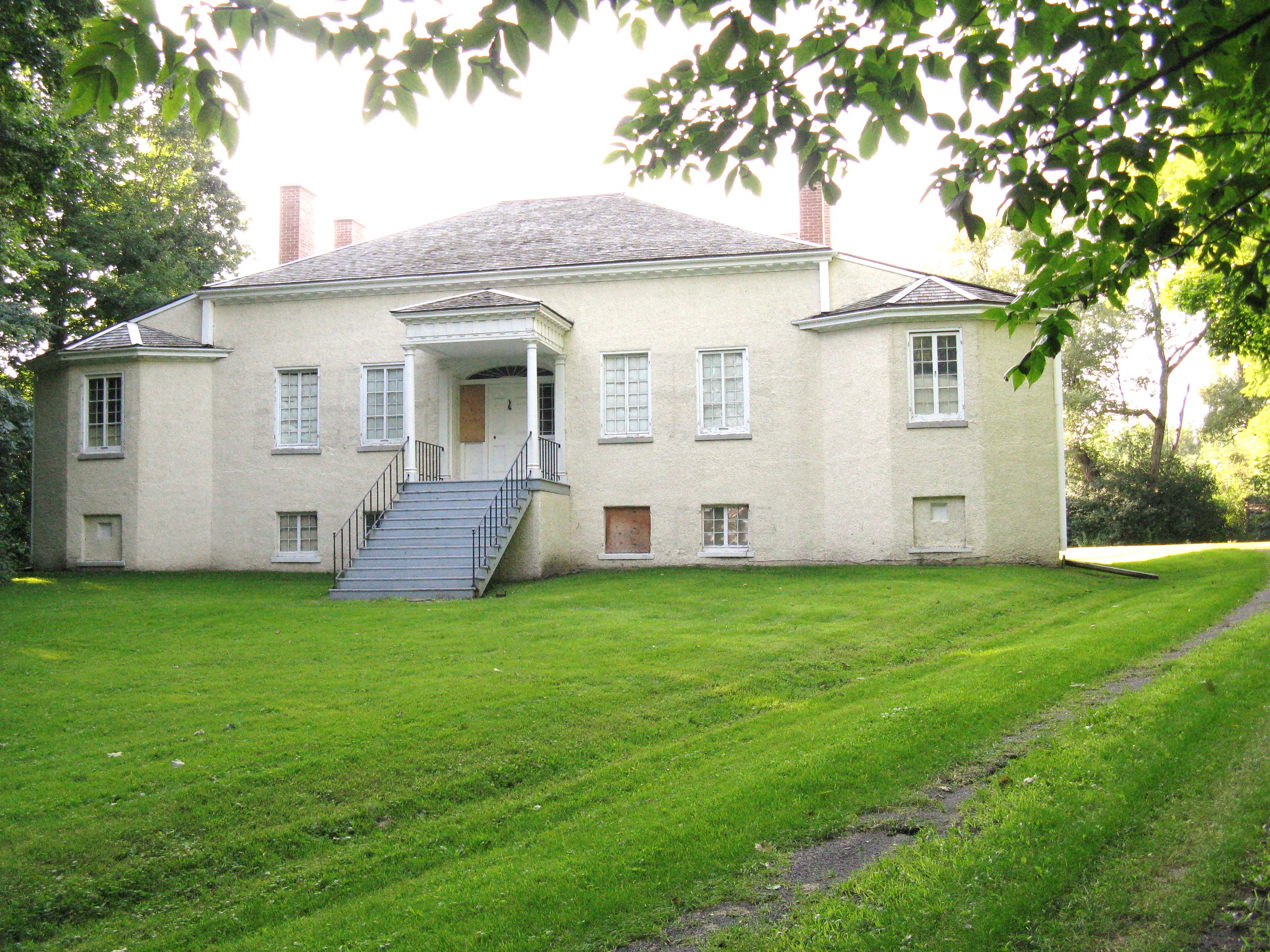
Built in 1816, MacDonald named the house 'Garth' for his childhood home. He left the house in 1823 and left it to his eldest daughter, Mrs Eliza Campbell. The house became known as Inverarden from the 1870s and remained in the Campbell family until 1965.

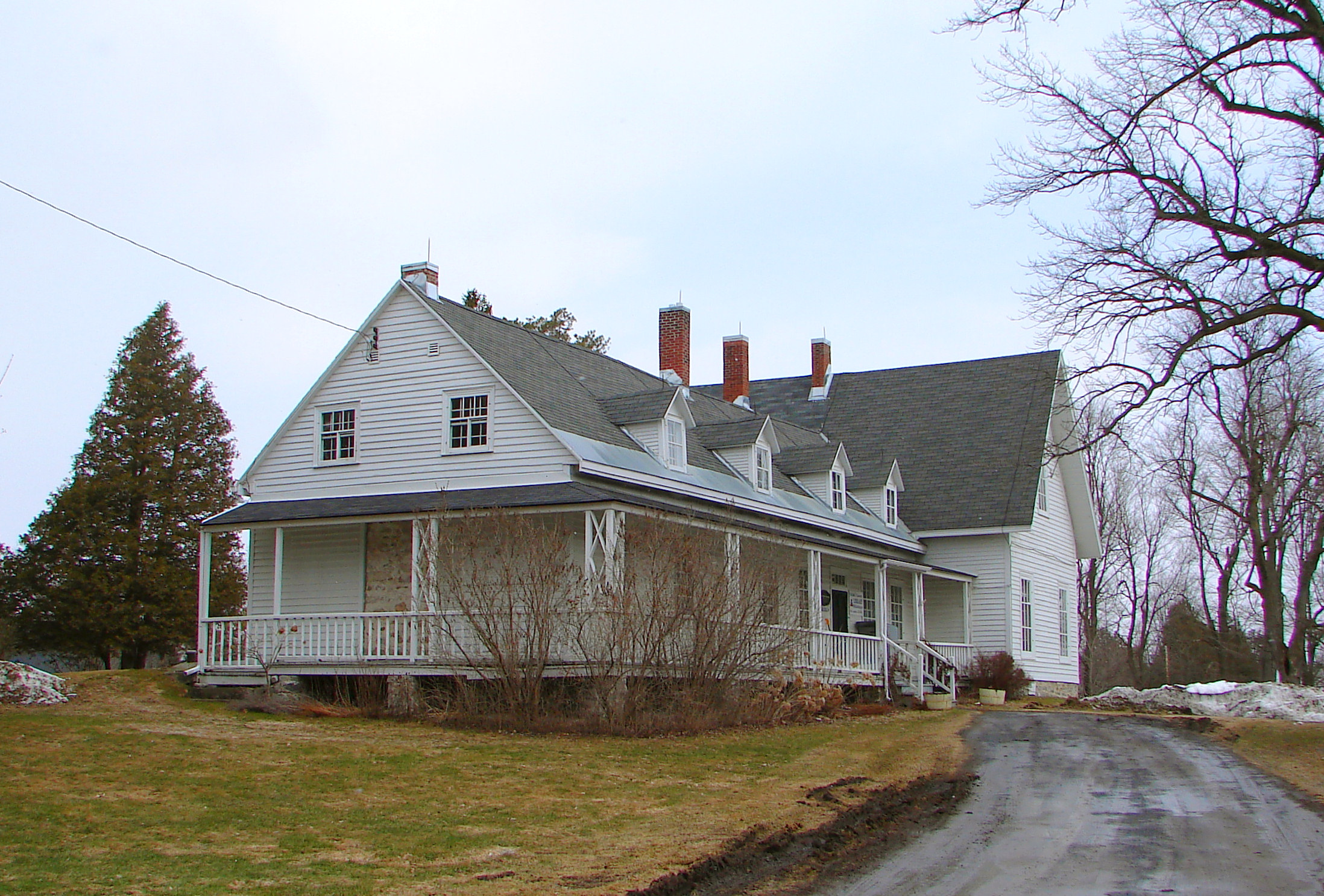
After MacDonald left his first wife in 1823, he moved into this home at Williamstown, which had belonged to his second wife's uncle, Hugh McGillis

In 1799, John MacDonald had married his Métis cousin, Nancy Small. She was a daughter of his mother's cousin, Patrick Small, by his country wife Nancy Hughes, daughter of longtime NWC bourgeois James Hughes and his Apslooké wife Nan-Touche Corbeau. Her father became a member of the Beaver Club in 1790 before leaving Nancy and her sister for England the following year. Nancy's sister, Charlotte Small, was married to David Thompson. MacDonald deserted Nancy and their home in 1823 to marry Amelia McGillis (d.1830), daughter of Duncan McGillis (1754–1838) and heiress of her uncle Hugh McGillis, another partner in the North West Company. They moved into her uncle's home at Williamstown, which was the former home of Sir John Johnson, 2nd Baronet. John MacDonald had five children by his first wife and six by his second. His children by both wives included:

- Eliza MacDonald. In 1822, she married John Duncan Campbell (1773–1835), a former partner of the North West Company before retiring to Montreal, Quebec. He was one of the fourteen children of The Hon. Alexander Campbell (1735–1800) and his second wife Magdalena van Sice of Schenectady, New York. His father was born at Killin, Perthshire, and came to North America as a young Lieutenant in the 42nd Royal Highland Regiment of Foot. During the American Revolution, he was imprisoned and later expelled from the United States, settling in Canada where he represented Dundas County in the Legislative Assembly of Upper Canada. In 1824, Eliza's father transferred the titleship of his home, Inverarden, to her and her husband. It remained in the Campbell family until 1965.
- Lt.-Col. The Hon. Rolland Macdonald, of Welland County, Ontario.
- Antoine Eustache de Bellefeuille MacDonald (1828–1894). He married Marie-Louise de Lotbiniere-Harwood (1830–1904), daughter of The Hon. Robert Unwin Harwood and Louise-Josephte, daughter and heiress of Michel-Eustache-Gaspard-Alain Chartier de Lotbinière. Their eldest son, John de Lotbiniere MacDonald (1857–1935), was named 22nd Chief of Clan MacDonald of Keppoch. Another of their sons married Anne MacDonald, niece of Sir William MacDonald, of Montreal, Quebec.

MacDonald retired in November 1814 and sold his two shares in the North West Company. In 1816, after having devoted over a year to socializing in Montreal, he purchased a small country estate at Gray's Creek, near Cornwall. There he built a regency villa, which he named after his childhood home, 'Garth'. When he deserted his first wife in 1823, he set up home with his new wife at Williamstown, Glengarry. He passed 'Garth' to his eldest daughter and her husband, John Campbell. The house came to be known as 'Inverarden' from the 1870s and remained in the Campbell family until 1965. At Glengarry, MacDonald was active in the local Presbyterian church and served as judge of the Surrogate Court of Glengarry County from 1832 until 1844.
