= James Inglis (physician) =

Scottish physician, author and geologist (1813–1851)

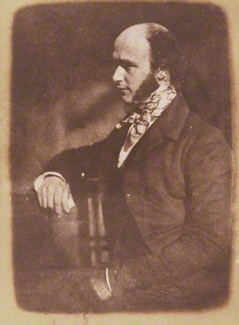
Dr. James Inglis, 1844 Portrait by David Octavius Hill, National Portrait Gallery, London

James Inglis (1813-1851) was a Scottish medical doctor, writer and geologist.

== Early life ==
James Inglis was born in Glasgow on 6 September 1813, the son of James Inglis, a merchant and his wife, Charlotte Spalding, the daughter of Charles Spalding, improver of the diving bell. Through his mother, Inglis was a member of the Smalls of Dirnanean, a Perthshire family that included direct ancestor, James Small, factor of the forfeited Robertson estates after Culloden.

After early schooling in Musselburgh, Inglis became a student at the University of Edinburgh. While a student in Edinburgh, he received the Hope prize for chemistry for his paper, Essay on iodine and bromine. His mentor during this time was Sir George Ballingall. Receiving his medical degree in 1834, he became a member of the Royal College of Physicians of England in that same year.

== Medical career ==
Inglis set up practice at Castle Douglas. In 1835, he performed a brilliant home operation on gunshot victim, Maria Kennedy, removing the bullet from behind her left frontal bone. She had been shot by Kirkcudbright Stewart-officer Robert Blair. The patient survived and Inglis provided detailed testimony of the operation and the condition of the patient at the trial.

In 1837 he moved to the Ripon Public Dispensary. Then in 1838, while at Ripon, Inglis published his Treatise of English Bronchocele. The work documented the epidemiology of goitre, using iodine treatment research Inglis had accumulated in both Scotland and England.

In 1838, Inglis moved his practice to Halifax, West Yorkshire.

== Other pursuits ==
Pursuing a lifelong passion for chemistry and geology, Inglis became the curator for the Halifax Literary & Philosophical Society. In 1843, while studying the Halifax coal beds, he discovered a new species of sea lily that he named Nautilus Rawsoni, which he named after Christopher Rawson, the founder of the Halifax Literary & Philosophical Society.

Interested in phrenology, Inglis researched the brain of Eugene Aram, an infamous English murderer.

Inglis was a Freemason and a past Master of the Yorkshire Lodge in Halifax.

== Personal life ==
Inglis married Louisa Rawson (ca. 1826-1909), the daughter of Jeremiah Rawson, Esq., on 3 May 1842 at St. John the Baptist Church in Halifax. The couple had the following children:

- Charlotte Hannah Louise Inglis (1843-1875), married Priestly Haigh Norris
- Major James Argyll Spalding Inglis (1848-1883), British District Commissioner of Nicosia, 1882-1883
- Charles John Inglis (b. 1850), a solicitor (father-in-law of Charles Hylton Stewart)

A great-granddaughter of Inglis was Surrealist performance artist Sheila Legge. A brother-in-law of Inglis, and a fellow physician, was Dr. Charles Ransford.

Inglis died at Halifax on 9 March 1851. His sister, St. Clair Ransford, attributed his early death to cardiac arrest, likely due to several bouts of rheumatic fever as a young man. Dr. Inglis and his wife were buried in Holy Trinity Churchyard in Halifax, which unfortunately has been converted into a car park.
