= Alexander Small =

Scottish surgeon and scholar

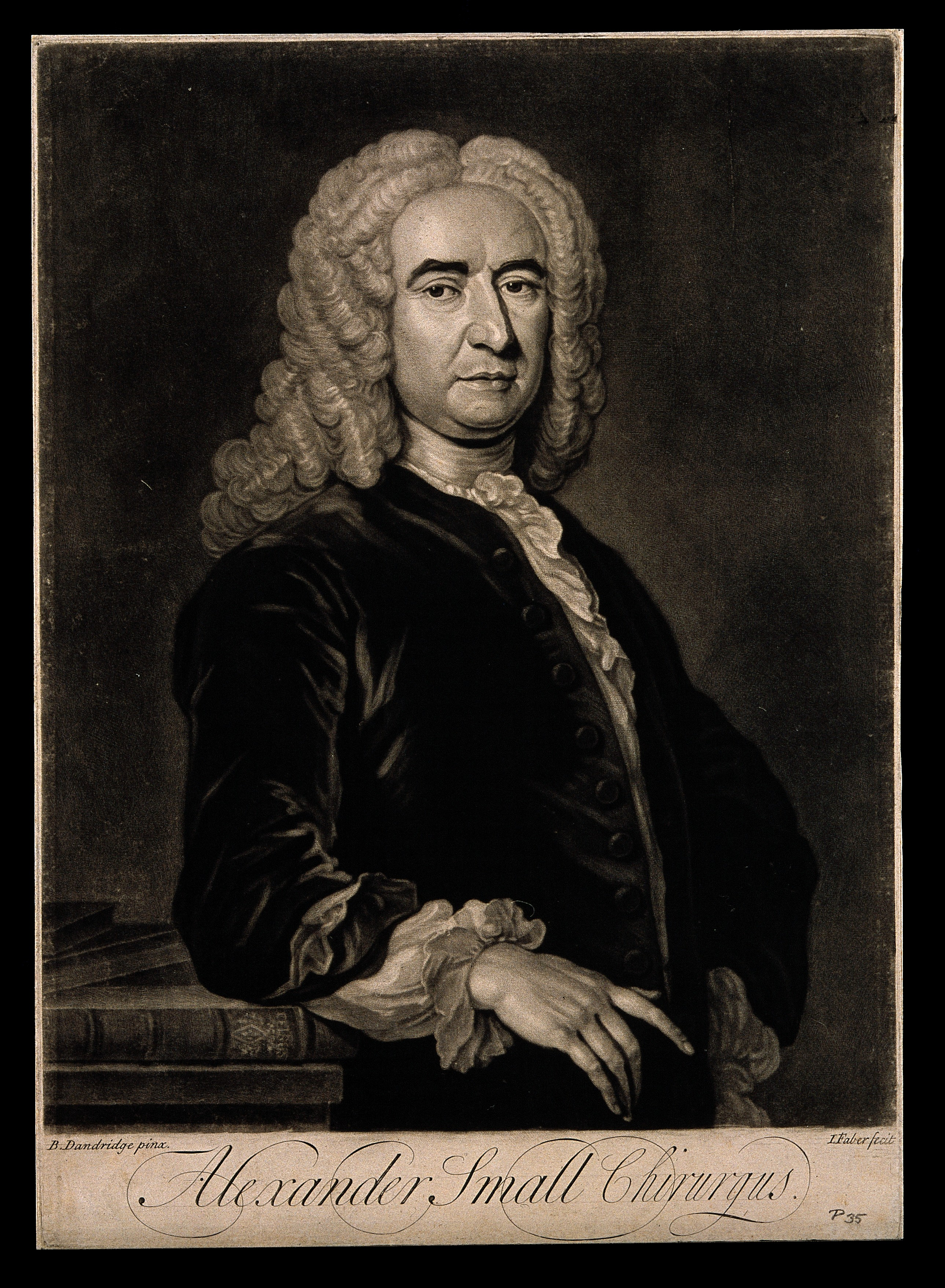
Alexander Small. Mezzotint by J. Faber, junior, after B. Dandridge.

Alexander Small (c. 1710 – 31 August 1794) was a Scottish surgeon and scholar, and a friend and frequent correspondent of Benjamin Franklin.

== Biography ==
=== Early life ===
Dr. Alexander Small was born c. 1710 in Perthshire, Scotland, the oldest son of Patrick Small of Leanoch and Magdalen Robertson of Straloch. Small and his father were members of the Smalls of Dirnanean.

=== Medical practitioner ===
Although it is not known where Alexander Small received his medical training, he served in the British army as a Field Assistance Surgeon (F.A.S). By 1733 he was serving as a surgeon for the British Royal Artillery in Menorca.

In 1736 Small arrived in London and began practising as a private surgeon. His obituary indicates his arrival in London coincided with the celebratory arrival of Princess Augusta of Saxe-Gotha just prior to her marriage to Frederick, Prince of Wales.

=== Scholarly pursuits ===
Around 1777 Dr. Small authored an essay on the importance to patient recovery and disease control of having good hospital ventilation. Benjamin Franklin may have assisted in the editing of the paper. The essay was eventually presented in Edinburgh and France.

In 1783, an elderly Dr. Small was working with Charles Spalding on his designs for an improved diving bell, when Spalding drowned in the Irish Sea diving in a bell of his design. Charles Spalding was married to Dr. Small's niece, Susan Small, the daughter of his brother James Small of Kinloch Rannoch.

=== Correspondence with Benjamin Franklin ===
Dr. Small and Benjamin Franklin were correspondents for at least thirty years, likely until Franklin's death. Franklin referred to them as "philosophers, who study and converse for the benefit of mankind."

Alexander Small and Benjamin Franklin corresponded frequently, on topics as varied as agriculture, horticulture, apiculture, hospital ventilation, pickling sturgeon, new ways of uprooting trees, poor interest rates, and politics.

At some point during their friendship, Dr. Small gifted a copy of the Iliad. Currently in the possession of the Library Company of Philadelphia, it is inscribed in Franklin's hand with the notation, "A Gift of Mr. Small, of London, Surgeon, to the Library."

In one of their earliest known letters, a 12 May 1760 letter from Franklin to Small, Franklin addresses the formation of Northeast storms in North America. In 1773 Small was elected to the American Philosophical Society, which was founded by Franklin.

In a letter written on 22 July 1780, while Franklin was in Paris, Franklin reconciles himself to the fact that Dr. Small will not be accepting a dinner invitation because of his concern for appearance's sake of them dining together due their differing politics, then closes the letter with an update on his recurring battle with gout. In lieu of dinner on this particular occasion, Franklin sent his grandson to pay his respects to the surgeon.

By a 19 February 1789, Franklin's letter to Small deals with the elderly pairs ailments and Franklin's limited social outings.

=== Family ===
Dr. Alexander Small's younger brothers were Major General John Small, later the Lieutenant-Governor of Guernsey and James Small, Factor of forfeited Struan Estates in Perthshire. Small was also the first cousin of General John Reid, the last Baron Reid in Perthshire.

Small died at the age of 84 at Ware, Hertfordshire, England on 31 August 1794. He is buried in the churchyard of St. John the Baptist Anglican Church, Great Amwell, Hertfordshire, England.
