= James Small (Scottish factor) =

James Small (died 21 August 1777) was a retired Army officer, a factor of forfeited estates in Perthshire and an improver of Kinloch Rannoch, Scotland.

== Early life ==
James Small was a member of the Smalls of Dirnanean and the Robertsons of Straloch. Born in Perthshire, Scotland, he was the son of Patrick Small of Leanoch and Magdalen Robertson of Straloch. Small's younger brother was Major-General John Small, later Lieutenant Governor of Guernsey. His older brother was Dr. Alexander Small, army surgeon and frequent correspondent of Benjamin Franklin. Small was also a first cousin of John Reid, the last Baron Reid in Perthshire, Scotland.

Following the family military tradition, Small became an ensign in Lord Loudoun's Regiment and was stationed at Finnart.

== After Culloden ==
After the Battle of Culloden (1746), Kinloch Rannoch was in a desperate state. There were no roads, the people were starving and thievery was commonplace. Additionally, the soldiers dispatched to the area to hunt down the Jacobite survivors contributed to the general sense of lawlessness within the town.

As punishment for supporting the Jacobite cause, many of the large Scottish landowners had to forfeit their estates back to The Crown. In turn, The Crown appointed property managers or factors to oversee the estates. In 1754 James Small was appointed factor of the forfeited Robertsons of Straun estates, near Kinloch Rannoch.

As factor, Small provided for disbanded soldiers to become crofters. He gave advice for the building of roads and bridges, the planning of schools and the erection of churches. Working with Dugald Buchanan and his wife, schools were established for the teaching of spinning and weaving. Experienced masons, joiners and wheelwrights were brought in to teach the younger generation useful trades. A less successful effort of Small's was attempting to drain the marshy land surrounding Kinloch Rannoch with a series of drainage ditches, that became known as The Soldiers' Trenches, but overall Small's efforts brought stability and prosperity to the area.

While still serving as factor in the Kinloch Rannoch area, James Small died on 21 August 1777, at Chorley, Lancashire. His gravestone, now inside St Laurence, Chorley Parish Churchyard, records that he died at Chorley while on a journey to Buxton. The church register states that he was buried at 7 o'clock in the morning on 23 August 1777.

== Personal life ==
On 1 January 1739, Small married Katharine Wilson, daughter of the town clerk of St. Andrews. The couple had three daughters that survived to adulthood.

The husband of Small's daughter, Susan, was Charles Spalding. Spalding, an Edinburgh confectioner by trade, was the improver of the diving bell. He died diving to the wreck of the Belgioso in Dublin Bay in a bell of his design.

Small was the grandfather of Sir Archibald Campbell, 1st Baronet of New Brunswick and Canadian fur trader John MacDonald of Garth. He was the great-grandfather of Sir John Campbell, 2nd Baronet of New Brunswick. Charles Falconer, Baron Falconer of Thoroton is also a descendant of James Small, as well as Sheila Legge, the "Surrealist Phantom" from the 1936 London International Surrealist Exhibition.
