= Gloria Komai =

British poet and translator

Gloria Mari-Ko Komai
- Born: 1922; Kensington, London
- Died: 2008 (aged 85–86); Eastbourne, East Sussex
- Occupations: Poet, translator
- Father: Gonnoske Komai
- Relatives: H. G. Wells (godfather)

Gloria Mari-Ko Komai (1922 – 2008) was a British poet and translator of Japanese descent who fellow writer and translator James Kirkup described as being 'the first poet [he] knew to introduce Japanese sensibility into her work'.

== Early life ==
Gloria Mari-Ko Komai was the daughter of Japanese artist and poet Gonnoské Komai and classical dancer Norah Howard Morgan (b. 1896), the daughter of a Sheffield optician. She had a sister named Fuji-Ko. Gloria's godfather was H. G. Wells, and her sister's John Galsworthy. In 1939, she told the Sheffield Daily Telegraph that she was writing a novel to help her ill father. The paper noted that Komai spoke Japanese and French in addition to English, and had never been to school - having been privately educated at home.

== Poetry ==
In his autobiography, I, of all people, James Kirkup remembers Gloria Komai as one of the poets who attended readings organised by the Progressive League's Contemporary Poetry and Music Circle in London's Ethical Church. Komai's poems appeared in Time and Tide, Poetry Quarterly, and other literary journals. Some of these were published in the collection Never Despair of Gardens (1947). Other collections included In Wake of Wind (1949), The Meditations [of] Marcus Aurelius: a cycle of sonnets (1952), and Mountains of the Moon (1953). All of these were published by Sylvan Press. Komai's poem 'Earth Pushes up the Frosted Window' was included in Little Reviews Anthology 1949 (ed. Denys Val Baker).

In 1954, Komai contributed translations of some poems by France Prešeren to what the editors described as 'a pioneer literary collaboration between two nations which are widely separated by geography and history... for the first time English and Slovene literary colleagues have made a common effort to present to the English-speaking world a selection from the poems by the greatest Slovene national poet, France Prešeren.'

In 1950, in a review of her poems in Poetry Quarterly, Komai was described as 'a poet of unusual sensibility.' The reviewer wrote that 'the images she summons forth to celebrate the seasons have an almost three-dimensional nature'.

In 2020, Gloria Komai was included in Apocalypse: An Anthology. A review of the collection in The Fortnightly Review described Komai as among those 'unremembered' poets of the 1930s-50s who had been 'excitedly discovered in comments on this book', alongside Antonia White, Freda Laughton, and Sheila Legge.

== Death ==
Gloria Komai died in Eastbourne in 2008.
