= The Soldiers' Trenches, Moor of Rannoch =

Drainage ditches in Scotland

Coordinates: 56.634°N 4.574°W

The Soldiers' Trenches: Scottish Gaelic: Lub Nam Buth
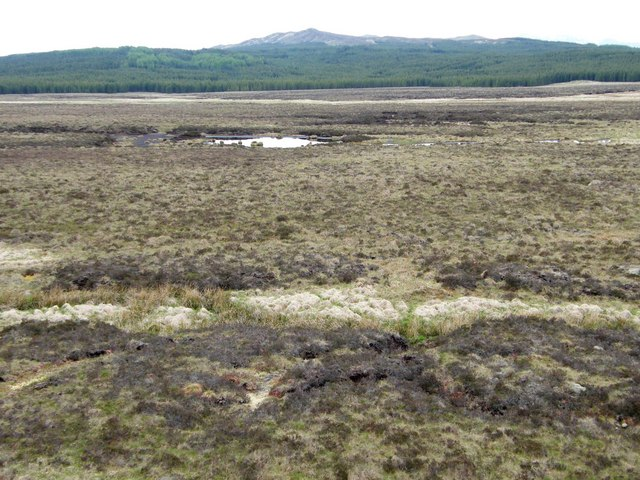
- The Soldiers' Trenches

- Location within Perth and Kinross
- OS grid reference: NN 42178 52198
- Council area: Perth and Kinross
- Country: Scotland
- Sovereign state: United Kingdom
- Police: Scotland
- Fire: Scottish
- Ambulance: Scottish

The Soldiers' Trenches on Rannoch Moor are drainage ditches dug by British army soldiers in 1763-64 in an attempt to drain part of the Moor of Rannoch, Fortingall Parish, Perth and Kinross, Scotland. The aim was to produce agriculturally useful land for crops, grazing, etc.

== History ==
Close to the West Highland Line, about three miles (5 km) from the Gruund, are five large parallel drainage ditches known as 'The Soldiers' ditches' that were dug by British army soldiers between 1763 and 1764 under the direction of Ensign James Small of Lord Loudoun's Regiment, the Government Factor of the forfeited estate of the Jacobite supporters, the Robertsons of Struan in Kinloch Rannoch.

Ensign Small had been stationed at Finnart and in 1754 he took up his new appointment and remained here in office until 1777 when he died, having made many considerable improvements in the area and especially to agriculture, such as the use of lime, a crushing machine being introduced so that lime could be used to reduce the acidic nature of the ground. In 1739 James Small married Katharine Wilson and had three daughters. His younger brother was Major General John Small.

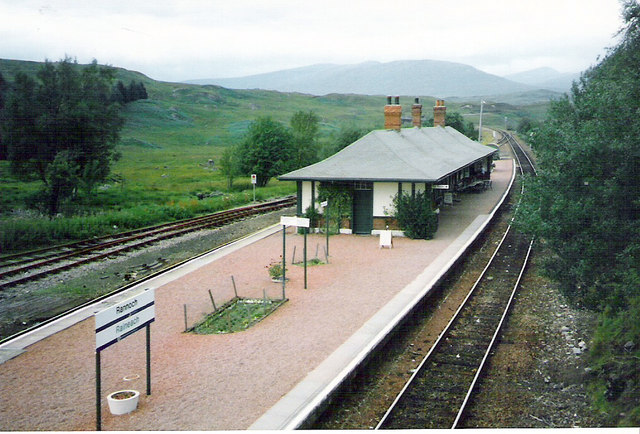
Rannoch Station.

These lands were the site of the summer shielings of the Rannoch inhabitants and the intention was to produce land upon which crops could be grown and pasture created. These extensive works, intended to "drain and sweeten the soil" were in vain and the lands were left to their previous purpose, however such was the extent of the excavations that they remain visible and attracted the name of 'The Soldiers trenches'.

The West Highland Line, 3¾ miles (6 km) from Rannoch railway station, cut through the Soldiers' Trenches that are now visible only as Sphagnum moss filled linear structures on the moorland. The drains ran from Abhainn Duibhe to the railway on the south-eastern side of the moor.

== See also ==
- List of places in Perth and Kinross
