= Charles Ransford =

British physician

Charles Ransford, M.D., was a traditionally educated British physician and a Fellow of the Royal College of Physicians of Edinburgh, who later became the private physician of the Duke of Northumberland and an early advocate of homoeopathic medicine.

== Early life ==
Ransford was born in Bristol, Gloucestershire, England, in about 1808.

== Fellow in Edinburgh ==
Ransford began his medical education at the Bristol Royal Infirmary. He later studied in London and Paris before attending the University of Edinburgh, where he graduated with his medical degree in 1833. In 1835 he was inducted as a Fellow of the Royal College of Physicians of Edinburgh. He fulfilled this position for the next 15 years. He was elected the college's treasurer and examiner, and had the task of straightening out its finances during a period of financial turmoil.

During his tenure as an FRCPE, Dr. Ransford was an outspoken critic of homoeopathy, even blocking the election of a Fellow candidate who professed faith in homoeopathy.

In 1835 Ransford was elected a member of the Harveian Society of Edinburgh and served as President in 1846. In 1839 he was elected a member of the Aesculapian Club.

== Private practice ==
In 1848, Dr. Ransford resigned from his position in Edinburgh and entered into a general practice partnership in Alnwick, Northumberland, England.

It was during his time in Alnwick that Dr. Ransford first embraced homoeopathic medicine. After seeing its benefits with his patients, he began conducting his own homoeopathic experiments. He consulted with Dr. Rutherford Russell and Dr. Hayle of Rochdale. So swayed in his thinking, Dr. Ransford wrote an essay for the British Journal of Homoeopathy that was later made into a pamphlet entitled, "Reasons for Embracing Homoeopathy". Other homoeopathic articles written by Dr. Ransford include, "The Prevention and Treatment of Scarlatina" and "The Pathogenic Symptoms of Mercurius".

Dr. Ransford eventually became the physician of the Duke of Northumberland, a prominent proponent of homoeopathy.

Dr. Ransford later moved his practice to York, where he remained for ten years, after that removing to Sydenham where he practiced into the 1880s. He finally settled in Winchester, Hampshire.

== Personal life ==
On 28 August 1833, Charles Ransford married St. Clair Inglis (1802-1910) at Leopold Place in Edinburgh, Scotland. Ransford's wife was a native of Glasgow and a member of the Smalls of Dirnanean. She was the granddaughter of Charles Spalding, an Edinburgh confectioner and an improver of the diving bell who drowned in Dublin Bay in 1783 while diving in a bell of his own design.

Dr. Ransford's oldest daughter was Episcopalian Deaconess, Charlotte Spalding Ransford.

A brother-in-law of Dr. Ransford, and a fellow physician, was Dr. James Inglis.

Charles Ransford died on 11 July 1886 at The Hospital of St. Cross in Winchester, Hampshire, England.
