= Sheila Legge =

Scottish Surrealist performance artist

- Born: Sheila C. Chetwynd Inglis; 1911; Penzance, England
- Died: 5 January 1949 (aged 37); Banyuls-sur-Mer, France
- Resting place: Cimetière Communal de Banyuls-sur-Mer, France
- Known for: Performance art
- Movement: Surrealism
- Spouse(s): Rupert Maximilian Faris Legge (m. 1934, divorced) John Lodwick
- Children: Douglas Robin Legge; Ursula Lodwick; Quentin Malaky Lodwick

Sheila Legge (née Chetwynd Inglis; c. 1911 – 5 January 1949) was a Surrealist performance artist. Legge is best known for her 1936 Trafalgar Square performance for the opening of London International Surrealist Exhibition, posing in a costume inspired by a Salvador Dalí painting, with her head completely obscured by a flower arrangement.

== Early life and family ==
Sheila Legge was born Sheila C. Chetwynd Inglis in 1911 at Penzance in Cornwall, the daughter of Lieutenant James Arthur Chetwynd Inglis of the Scottish Highland Light Infantry, 4th Battalion and Ida Evelyn Kerr, a Scot, from Melbourne, Australia. Her father was the only child of Major James Argyll Spalding Inglis, commissioner of Nicosia and the grandson of Dr. James Inglis, a Scottish physician and author. Through her father, Legge was a member of the Smalls of Dirnanean, a Perthshire family that included Legge's direct ancestors Charles Spalding, improver of the diving bell, and James Small, factor of the forfeited Robertson estates after the Battle of Culloden.

Prior to the start of World War I, Legge's family, which now included an additional daughter, was living in Tahiti where Legge's father was working as a mining engineer. At the outbreak of the war, he returned to Scotland and rejoined his battalion from the Boer War. In March 1915, while his wife was serving as a nurse in France, Legge's father joined the 1st Battalion Seaforth Highlanders. Within days of arriving at the regiment's headquarters, he was killed in a trench in Flanders on 9 May 1915.

Little is known about Legge's life after her father died, except for the numerous passenger lists detailing the family's world travels. On 1 January 1919 Legge's mother, who at the time was listed as a YMCA worker, married John Sharpe Sutherland at the British Consulate in Cairo, Egypt.

Early in 1934 at Kensington in London, Legge married her first husband, Rupert Maximilian Faris Legge and gave birth to a son in April of that year. The marriage ended within the year and the couple placed their child to be raised by family friends.

== Surrealism ==
In 1935, Legge wrote to David Gascoyne expressing her fondness for his book A Short Survey of Surrealism and offering to help organise a Surrealist group in England. At the time Legge was living in a bedsit in Earl's Court in central London. Gascoyne made arrangements to meet Legge, and later described her as "a warm, good-natured, intelligent, frustrated young woman" with an "eagerness for experience" and "a genuinely keen curiosity" about contemporary culture", "especially surrealism." Gascoyne also noted that she was fluent in French, "able to read Raymond Roussel in the original."

Art historians differ in their opinions as to when Gascoyne and Legge met. Some believe Gascoyne recruited Legge for his "Surrealist Phantom" exhibit for the 1936 London International Surrealist Exhibition only a few days before the exhibit was to open. While others believe Legge participated in the planning of the exhibit. The latter scenario is more likely, as Legge was already moving in Surrealist circles, having her portrait sketched by Man Ray in March 1936. and Legge is seated in the front row of the group photo of the organisers of the London exhibition.

Gascoyne, whatever the level of collaboration with Legge, was instrumental in transforming her into a walking "Surrealist Phantom", the living embodiment of a Salvador Dalí painting, that the Surrealist group used to draw attention to the opening of the exhibit. The ensemble chosen for the exhibition was a white, drop tail hemmed wedding dress designed by the Motley Theatre Design Group and accessorised with sheer black evening gloves, coral-coloured shoes and a belt. Obscuring Legge's entire head was a mask of roses from a Mayfair florist.

On the opening day of the 1936 International Surrealist Exhibition, Gascoyne led Legge, dressed as the "Surrealist Phantom", to Trafalgar Square. Once there, Legge stood in front of the Trafalgar lions as Claude Cahun took photographs, as pigeons began to perch on her outstretched arms. From Trafalgar Square the group headed up the Haymarket and Piccadilly to the New Burlington Galleries. As André Breton gave remarks to officially open the exhibition, Legge wandered through the gallery crowds carrying a prosthetic leg with a silk stocking on it as a prop. Some accounts also have her carrying a raw pork chop, that she later abandoned when it began to smell.

Legge's contribution to the Surrealist movement appears to be limited to a few years in the 1930s. Legge appeared in several promotional newspaper articles for the London International Surrealist Exhibition, and appeared on the cover of the fourth issue of the International Surrealist Bulletin dressed as the "Phantom Surrealist" in September 1936. Legge's Surrealist poem, I Have Done My Best For You, appeared in the December 1936 edition of Contemporary Poetry and Prose. In 1937, Legge participated in the surrealist objects show at the London Gallery, and E. L. T. Mesens wanted to hire her as the secretary for his London Gallery in 1938.

An attractive woman with long blonde hair, Legge has often been relegated to the role of a "surrealist groupie" by various art historians who have identified her as a possible lover of David Gascoyne, Dylan Thomas and René Magritte. Legge's more noteworthy contribution is undoubtedly her performance as the "Surrealist Phantom" at the 1936 International Surrealist Exhibition, making Legge among the most photographed surrealist artists of all time.

== After the 1936 exhibition ==
Legge met John Lodwick at Orange in Vichy France on 13 January 1942 while Lodwick was working on his first novel, Running to Paradise, which he dedicated to her when it was published in 1943. By 1945, Legge and Lodwick were living in Cornwall with their two children, with Legge working as a book collector.

Legge died on 5 January 1949 while living at Villa Boramar in Banyuls-sur-Mer in the Pyrénées-Orientales region of France and was buried in the Cimetière Communal de Banyuls-sur-Mer there. The cause of death was pleurisy and pneumonia.

The 1936 Man Ray sketch of Legge, entitled "Sheila", was published in April 1970 part of a series of fourteen etchings entitled The Ballad of The Ladies Out of Time, accompanied by text by André Breton from 1934.

In 2015, academic Silvano Levy published a book on Legge entitled Sheila Legge Phantom of Surrealism. Up to the publication of this book, nothing was known about Legge, other than her performance at the opening of the International Surrealist Exhibition in 1936.

In 2016, a theatre group in New York City included Legge as a character in a play based on parts of Rene Magritte's life, entitled, A Journey Through The Mind Of The Surrealist Painter.
