= John Lodwick =

British novelist

- Born: John Alan Patrick Lodwick; 2 March 1916; Cheltenham, United Kingdom
- Died: 16 March 1959 (aged 43); Spain
- Citizenship: British
- Education: Royal Naval College Dartmouth
- Occupation: Novelist
- Spouse: Sheila LeggeJeanne Guilbaud
- Children: Ursula Lodwick, Malachy Lodwick, Rodrigo Lodwick, Dominique Lodwick
- Writing career
- Genres: Psychological thrillers, military/naval adventures

John Alan Patrick Lodwick (2 March 1916 – 18 March 1959) was a British novelist.

== Life ==
Son of a father in the Indian Army, who died in the sinking of the SS Persia just before his son's birth, Lodwick attended Cheltenham College and the Royal Naval College at Dartmouth. He spent some time working as a journalist in Dublin before moving to France. He later recalled writing several unpublished novels during this period, but in a contrasting account stated that he wrote only plays. He joined the French Foreign Legion at the outbreak of World War II, and was awarded the Croix de Guerre in 1940. His prize-winning first novel, which he began to write while stranded in Vichy France, Running to Paradise, is a fictionalised account of combat with the Legion and experiences as a prisoner of war. Subsequently, he served as an officer in the Special Operations Executive, parachuting behind enemy lines to work undercover as a saboteur, and, in the rank of captain, served with the Special Boat Service on raids in the Mediterranean and the Aegean. He was mentioned in dispatches in 1945.

In addition to novels, he also published two volumes of autobiography, the second left incomplete at the time of his death in a car accident in Spain. Some of his books reflect his war experiences, including his exploits as an officer in the Special Boat Service. He also wrote thrillers which analyse the psychological and spiritual motivations of their protagonists.

== Critical reception ==
The novels were admired by the author Somerset Maugham. A few years after Lodwick's death, Anthony Burgess wrote: "He is not afraid of rhetoric, grandiloquence; his knowledge of foreign literature is wide; his mastery of the English language matches Evelyn Waugh's." He warned, nevertheless, that because of his early death he was "in danger of being neglected", and indeed D. J. Taylor has written that in the post-war years Lodwick's "doomy romanticism sat queerly alongside the comic realism of a Waterhouse or an Amis: Lodwick's reputation did not survive the 1960s." He has been described as an "odd-man-out" among his literary contemporaries, and credited with a "picaresque and romantic" imagination.

== Novels ==
- Running To Paradise (1943)
- Myrmyda: A Novel of the Aegean (1946) (U.S. title: Aegean Adventure)
- Peal of Ordnance (1947)
- Twenty East of Greenwich; or, A Barnum Among The Robespierres (1947)
- Brother Death (1948)
- Something in the Heart (1948)
- Just A Song at Twilight (1949)
- Stamp Me Mortal (1950)
- First Steps Inside The Zoo (1950) (U.S. title: The Man Dormant)
- The Cradle of Neptune (1951)
- Love Bade Me Welcome (1952)
- Somewhere A Voice Is Calling (1953)
- The Butterfly Net (1954)
- The Starless Night (1955)
- Contagion To This World (1956)
- Equator (1957)
- The Moon Through A Dusty Window (1960)

== Autobiography ==
- Bid The Soldiers Shoot (1958)
- The Asparagus Trench: An Autobiographical Beginning (1960)

== Other works ==
- The Filibusters:The Story of the Special Boat Service (1947) (re-issued as Raiders from the Sea)
- The Forbidden Coast: The Story of a Journey To Rio De Oro (1956)
- (With D.H. Young) Gulbenkian: An Interpretation of Calouste Sarkis Gulbenkian (1958)
