= Gonnoske Komai =

Japanese artist and poet (1874–1956)

Gonnoské Komai
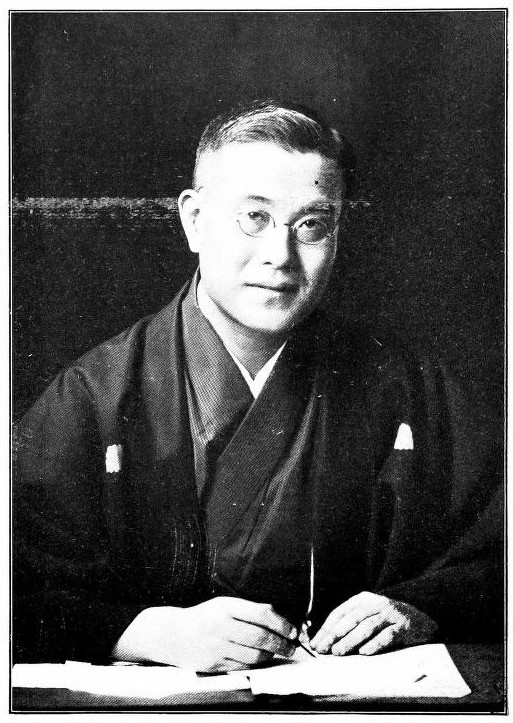
- Born: 1874; Japan
- Died: 1956 (aged 81–82); Dartford, Kent
- Occupations: Poet; artist; translator
- Children: Gloria; Fuji-Ko

Gonnoské Komai (Japanese: 駒井権之助, romanized: Komai Gonnosuke; 1874 – 1956) was a Japanese poet, artist, and war correspondent, who became well-known in England. Once in Britain, he wrote and lectured regularly on Japanese subjects, with one contemporary describing Komai as being 'unrivalled' among 'modern interpreters of Japan.' Komai was noted for continuing to wear his native dress throughout his life in England.

== Life ==
Gonnoské Komai was born in Japan in 1874. He married Sheffield-born Norah Howard Morgan in Willesden in 1921, and the couple had two daughters: Gloria Mari-Ko Komai (born 1922) and Felicia (Fuji-Ko, born 1926). In London, Komai lived at 73 Harcourt Terrace, Kensington.

Komai worked as correspondent for The Daily Telegraph during the Russo-Japanese War, and for The Times during World War I. He was present at the First Conference of PEN in London in 1923.

Komai was a friend of artist Augustus John, who painted him. He was active in the literary and cultural scene of London, with H. G. Wells and John Galsworthy being godfathers to his daughters.

Gonnoské Komai died in 1956 in Dartford, Kent.

== Works ==
- Dreams from China and Japan: being transfusions from the Japanese and Chinese languages (1918)
- Fuji from Hampstead Heath (1925)
- Fuji-Yama and other poems (1934)
- America and Japan (19--)
- Japan Yesterday and Today (1936)
- Exhibition of water-colours on silk by leading contemporary Japanese artists (1937)
