= 95th Regiment of Foot (Reid's) =

- Active: 1779–1783
- Country: Kingdom of Great Britain
- Branch: British Army
- Type: Line Infantry
- Role: Infantry
- Size: One battalion
- Engagements: Battle of Jersey

Commanders
- Colonel of the Regiment: Maj.-Gen. John Reid

The 95th Regiment of Foot (Reid's) was an infantry regiment of the British Army.

The unit was one of seven regiments, six of them regular infantry, raised on 23 July 1779 in response to the French intervention in the American Revolutionary War. The French entry into the war forced a change in British strategy. England itself now being considered vulnerable, the French intervention precipitated "feverish activity in raising levies for defence of the country." Parliament passed a bill calling for the creation of "loyal corps of volunteers," but before any could actually be formed, "noblemen and gentlemen came forward with offers to raise regular regiments at their own expense." The 95th Regiment of Foot was the regiment raised by John Reid.

The regiment was in the field from 7 April 1780 until 31 May 1783, the day it was disbanded. It participated in the Battle of Jersey.

The regiment's uniforms consisted of buff waistcoats and buff breeches, the facings buff as well. The officers' lace and buttons were silver; the lace of the rank and file was plain white. All ranks wore fringed wings and coats with ten square loops.
