= Renaissance and Baroque Society of Pittsburgh =

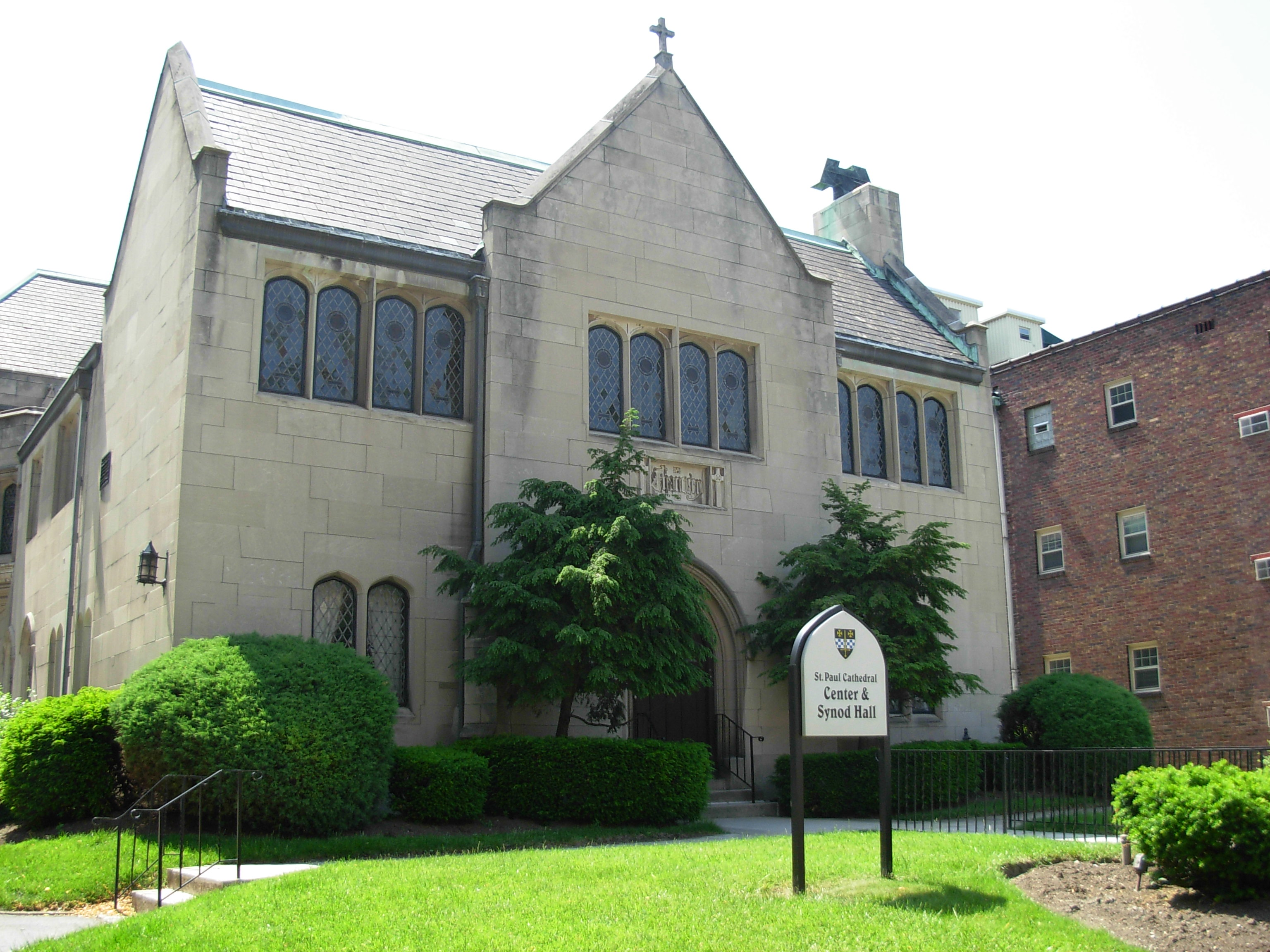
Synod Hall, the main performance venue of the Renaissance and Baroque Society of Pittsburgh

Renaissance & Baroque, formerly known as the Renaissance and Baroque Society of Pittsburgh is a non-profit performing arts organization in Pittsburgh, Pennsylvania that presents performances of music from the Medieval, Renaissance, Baroque and early Classical periods with an emphasis on historically informed performance. The New Grove Dictionary of Music and Musicians, describes it as having "developed one of the area's most faithful and enthusiastic followings." Its main performance venue is Synod Hall, adjacent to the Cathedral of Saint Paul. Among the ensembles which have been presented by the society are Apollo's Fire, Trio Medieval, Quadriga Consort and The Academy of Ancient Music.

The society was established in 1969 with Colin Sterne as one of its key founders. Sterne, a professor at the University of Pittsburgh, where he taught for 38 years until his retirement in 1986, was an expert on early music performance practice and the founder of the period-instrument ensemble, Ars Antiqua Players. According to the Pittsburgh Post-Gazette, both the Ars Antiqua Players and the Renaissance and Baroque Society "helped stimulate interest in pre-Bach music nationwide."

== 40th Anniversary Season ==
In the 2008–2009 season, the society celebrated its 40th anniversary. The program included performances by Tallis Scholars, Richard Egarr and Flanders Recorder Quartet as well as a new work commissioned by the society to commemorate the 250th anniversary of the Battle of Fort Duquesne. Battle of the Forks, an arrangement of writings and music from the period including two pieces of music by the English general John Reid (1721–1807), premiered on September 27, 2008 at Synod Hall in Pittsburgh performed by the Chris Norman Ensemble, Concerto Caledonia and members of the Carnegie Mellon University School of Drama.

== Re-branding ==
During the 2010–2011 season, Managing Director Gail M. Luley and the Board of Director decided to drop the "society" from the organization's name, and re-brand as Renaissance & Baroque, with the accompanying tagline: "bringing early music to Pittsburgh."

== 50th Anniversary Season ==
In the 2019–2020 season, Renaissance & Baroque will be celebrating its 50th anniversary.

== See also ==
- Early music revival
