= Archibald Macdonald (Canadian politician) =

British soldier and Upper Canada politician

Archibald Macdonald (ca 1787 – 3 March 1872) was a Scottish-born farmer and political figure in Upper Canada. He represented Northumberland in the Legislative Assembly of Upper Canada from 1830 to 1834 as a Conservative.

Born in Callander, Perthshire, he was a captain in the 33rd Regiment of Foot and served during the Napoleonic Wars. Macdonald came to Upper Canada in 1819 and received a land grant near Cobourg. He served as a colonel in the Northumberland militia and was a justice of the peace for the Newcastle District.

Macdonald was a younger brother of Canadian fur trader John MacDonald of Garth, and a brother-in-law of North West Company senior partner William McGillivray, as well as Sir Archibald Campbell, 1st Baronet, one-time Lieutenant-Governor of New Brunswick, Canada.

Archibald Macdonald died on 3 March 1872 and is buried with his wife and two of his daughters in St. Peter's Anglican Church Cemetery in Cobourg, Ontario.
