= Silvano Levy =

English surrealism academic

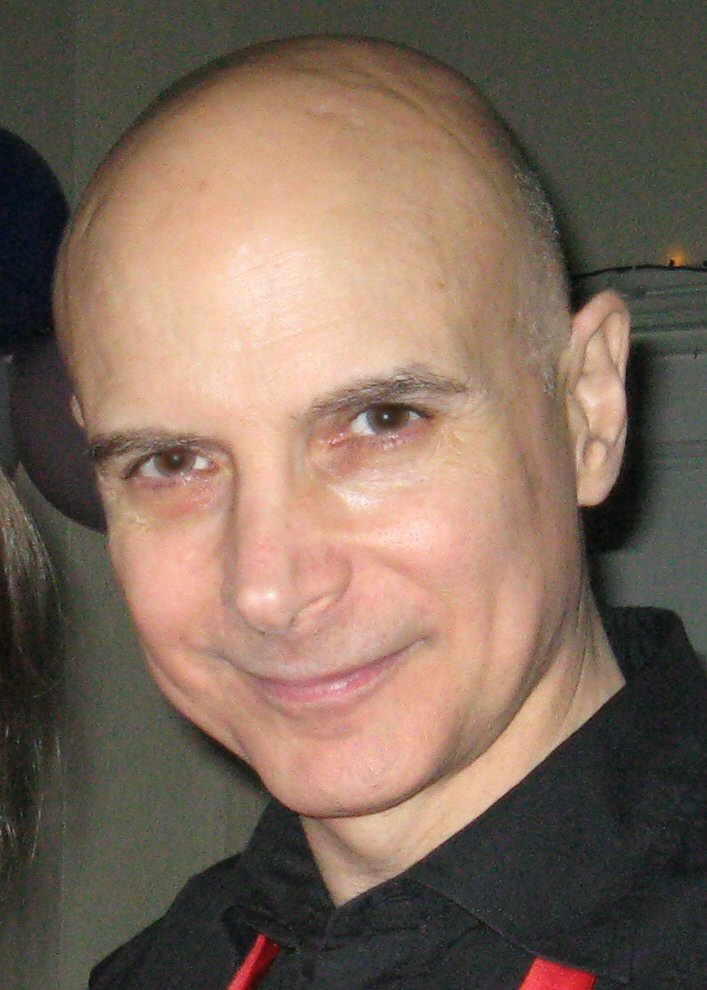
Silvano Levy

Silvano Levy is a British academic and author specialising in the surrealist movement, with extensive research on Conroy Maddox, René Magritte, and a comprehensive, multi-volume catalogue raisonné on Desmond Morris. Levy's focus on neglected women artists produced the first scholarly publications on Emmy Bridgwater, Dalla Husband, Sheila Legge and Mary Wykeham.

Dr Levy is editor of Surrealist Bulletin and has held academic posts at the University of Liverpool, Newcastle Polytechnic, the University of Bath, the University of Hull and Keele University, where he was promoted to Senior Lecturer in French in 1998 and then to Reader in 2005. Silvano Levy attended Tollington Grammar School in Muswell Hill, London and graduated from The University of Reading and The University of Kent at Canterbury.

== Bibliography ==
AUTHORED BOOKS

- (2026) Emmy Bridgwater: Surrealism of Angst (Paul Holberton Publishing, London), 208pp. 1-208
- (2023) Mary Wykeham: Surrealist out of the Shadows (Lund Humphries, London), 192 pp. 1-192
- (2020) Desmond Morris Late Work: Analytical Catalogue Raisonné 2012-2020 (Sansom & Co., Bristol), Hardback ISBN 978-1-911408-70-3, Paperback ISBN 978-1-911408-71-0, 288 pp. 1-288
- (2015) Decoding Magritte (Sansom & Co., Bristol) ISBN 9781906593957, 280 pp. 1–280
- (2014) Sheila Legge: Phantom of Surrealism (Dark Windows Press, Rhos-on-Sea) ISBN 978-1909769090, 114 pp. 1–114
- (2012) Desmond Morris: Analytical Catalogue Raisonné 2000–2012 (Redcliffe Press, Bristol), Standard Edition ISBN 978-1-906593-44-5, Collector's edition ISBN 978-1-906593-97-1, 312 pp. 1–312
- (2008) Dina Lenković (Vlastito Izdanje, Zagreb) ISBN 978-953-55071-09, 160 pp. 1–160
- (2008) Lines of Thought: The Drawings of Desmond Morris (Kettlestone Press, Norfolk) ISBN 978-0-9560153-0-3, 200 pp. 1–200
- (2003) The Scandalous Eye: The Surrealism of Conroy Maddox (Liverpool University Press) ISBN 0-85323-559-7, 292 pp. 1–292
- (2002) Desmond Morris, translation of Desmond Morris: Naked Surrealism with a foreword by Willy Van den Bussche (Petraco Pandora, Antwerp/Museum Voor Moderne Kunst, Ostend) ISBN 90-5325-201-0, 87 pp. 11–464
- (2001) Desmond Morris: Analytical Catalogue Raisonné 1944–2000 (Petraco Pandora, Antwerp) ISBN 90-5325-162-6, 464 pp. 1–464
- (1999) Desmond Morris: Naked Surrealism (Petraco Pandora, Antwerp) ISBN 90-5325-157-X, 240 pp. 1–240, augmented re-edition in Belgium of Desmond Morris: 50 Years of Surrealism
- (1997) Desmond Morris: 50 Years of Surrealism (Barrie and Jenkins, Ebury Press, London) ISBN 0-7126-7298-2, 224 pp. 1–224
- (1994) Understanding French Accounts (Pitman, London, Pearson Educational, London) ISBN 0-273-60307-8, 151 pp. 1–151

AUTHORED SHORT BOOKS & EXHIBITION CATALOGUES

- (2026) The Rationale of the Irrational (The Redfern Gallery, London), 155 pp. 1-16
- (2012) Desmond Morris Pintura (Instituto Superior de Psicologia Aplicada, Instituto Universitário, Lisbon), 8 pp. not paginated
- (2005) 'La psique al desnudo: La obra de Desmond Morris' in desmond morris pintor surrealista (Guillermo de Osma Galería, Madrid) Depósito legal M-37.070-2005, 21 pp. 1–21
- (2001) Conroy Maddox: A Surrealist Odyssey (Belgrave Gallery Publishing, London) ISBN 0-906647-06-1, 16 pp. 1–16
- (2000) Surrealism (Vade Mecum, Hereford) ISBN 0-7526-0127-X, 20 pp. 1–20
- (1997) Desmond Morris: A Surrealist World (Buxton Museum & Art Gallery) ISBN 0-906753-19-8, 7 pp. 1–7
- (1996) Desmond Morris: 50 Years of Surrealism (Stoke City Museum and Art Gallery) ISBN 1-874414-12-2, 16 pp. 1–16

EDITED COLLECTIONS

- (2013) (journal editor) Surrealist Bulletin IV: Arturo Schwarz (Kettlestone Press, Norfolk) ISBN 978-0-9560153-2-7, 16 pp. 1–16
- (2011) (journal editor) Surrealist Bulletin III: Patrick Hughes (Kettlestone Press, Norfolk) ISBN 978-0-9560153-1-0, 16 pp. 1–16
- with PIRSIG-MARSHALL, T. (2009) British Surrealism in Context. A Collector's Eye (Leeds Museums and Galleries), ISBN 978-0-901981-82-0, 223 pp. 1–223
- (2007) (journal editor) Surrealist Bulletin II: Desmond Morris (Belgrave Gallery, London) ISBN 978-0-906647-09-7, 16 pp. 1–16
- (2006) (journal editor) Surrealist Bulletin I: Toni del Renzio (Sherwin & Northern Artists Galleries, Leeds) ISBN 978-09553976-0-8, 16 pp. 1–16
- (1997) Surrealism: Surrealist Visuality (New York University Press) [Hardback ISBN 978-0-8147-5128-2, Paperback ISBN 0-8147-5127-X], 173 pp. 1–173
- (1996, 1997) Surrealism: Surrealist Visuality (Keele University Press) [Hardback 1996 ISBN 1-85331-170-7, Paperback 1997 ISBN 1-85331-193-6], 173 pp. 1–173
- (1995) Conroy Maddox: Surreal Enigmas (Keele University Press) ISBN 185331-1537, 190 pp. 1–190
- (1994, 2002 a) (series editor) Donaghy, P. & Laidler, J., Understanding Spanish Accounts (Pitman, Pearson Educational, London) ISBN 0 273 60308 6
- (1994, 2002 b) (series editor) Höffgen, A. & Duncalf-Edelsbacher, J., Understanding German Accounts (Pitman, Pearson Educational, London) ISBN 0 273 60309 4

CHAPTERS IN BOOKS & ONLINE SCHOLARLY PUBLICATIONS

- (2021) Dalla Husband’s Contribution to Atelier 17 in E. Gaffney (Ed.), Art Herstory (28 September 2021) https://artherstory.net/dalla-husbands-contribution-to-atelier-17/
- (2020) La Douce insurrection des poèmes de Desmond Morris/Gentle Mutiny: The Poems of Desmond Morris in M. REMY (Ed.) Desmond Morris À Tue-Tête. Headworks (Les Éditions du Grand Tamanoir, Caen, 2020), https://legrandtamanoir.net/desmond-morris-a-tue-tete-headworks/ 11 pp. 7-17
- (2020) Sheila Legge. Pork Chop or Not in I. PFEIFFER (Ed.), Fantastic Women. Surreal Worlds from Meret Oppenheim to Freda Kahlo (Schirn Kunsthalle Frankfurt, Frankfurt, 2020) ISBN 978-3-7774-3414-8, 4 pp. 125-128
- (2014) Attività del Gruppo Surrealista in Gran Bretagna 1936–2008 in A. SCHWARZ (Ed.), Il Surrealismo, ieri e oggi . Storia, filosofia, politica (Skira Rizzoli, New York, 2014) ISBN 978-88-572-1634-8, 46 pp. 213–258
- (2009) Toni del Renzio: Surrealist Champion or Antagonist? in S. LEVY & T. PIRSIG-MARSHALL, T. (Eds), British Surrealism in Context. A Collector's Eye (Leeds Museums and Galleries, 2009), ISBN 978-0-901981-82-0, 9 pp. 59–67
- (2007) Paul Nougé Constructing Absence in P. ALLMER & H. VAN GELDER (Eds), Collective Invention: Belgian Surrealism Reconsidered (LGC-Series, Leuven University Press, 2007) ISBN 978-90-5867-592-7, 13pp. 70–82
- (2004) Menace. Surrealist Interference of Space in T. MICAL (Ed.) Surrealism and Architecture (Routledge, London, 2004) ISBN 041532520X, 21 pp. 60–80
- (2000) Maddox, the Melvilles and Morris: Birmingham Surrealists in T. SIDEY (Ed.) Surrealism in Birmingham 1935 1954 (Birmingham Museums and Art Gallery, 2000) ISBN 0 7093 0235 5, 14 pp. 23 36
- (2000) André Breton and the Belgian Connection in R. FOTIADE (Ed.) André Breton – The Power of Language (Elm Bank Publications, Exeter, 2000) ISBN 1-902454-06-5, 13 pp. 125–137
- (1996 a) René Magritte: Representational Iconoclasm in S. LEVY (Ed.) Surrealism: Surrealist Visuality (Keele University Press, 1996) ISBN 1-85331-170-7, 15 pp. 15–29
- (1996 b) Introduction in S. LEVY (Ed.) Surrealism: Surrealist Visuality (Keele University Press, 1996) ISBN 1-85331-170-7, 4 pp. 7–10
- (1995 a) Dangerous Cities in S. LEVY (Ed.) Conroy Maddox: Surreal Enigmas (Keele University Press, 1995) ISBN 1-85331-153-7, 2 pp. 181–2
- (1995 b) In pursuit of Enigma: 1935–1940 in S. LEVY (Ed.) Conroy Maddox: Surreal Enigmas (Keele University Press, 1995) ISBN 1-85331-153-7, 6 pp. 7–12

PEER REVIEWED JOURNALS

- (2012) Magritte et le refus de l'authentique, Cycnos (Université de Nice Sophia Antipolis, L'Harmattan, Paris) ISBN 978-2-296-96098-5, ISBN 9782296960985, Vol. 28, No. 1, 'Le Refus, esthétique, littérature, société, musique', (M. REMY & C. GUTLEBEN Eds.) (July 2012), pp. 53–62
- (2007) Toni del Renzio in extremis: Alter Ego and Doppelganger, The Papers of Surrealism ISSN 1750-1954
- (2005) Magritte at the Edge of Codes, Image & Narrative Online Magazine of Visual Narrative ISSN 1780-678X, Issue 13 The Forgotten Surrealists: Belgian Surrealism Since 1924 (November 2005), University of Leuven.
- (2005) The del Renzio Affair: A leadership struggle in wartime surrealism, The Papers of Surrealism AHRC Research Centre for Studies of Surrealism and its Legacies ISSN 1750-1954, Issue 3, 34 pp. 1–34.http://www.surrealismcentre.ac.uk/papersofsurrealism/journal3/acrobat_files/Levy_article.pdf
- (2001) Jean-Martin Charcot, une source du surréalisme au dix-neuvième siècle, Pleine Marge ISSN 0295-1630, No. 34, 16 pp. 175–191
- (1997) Surrealism, the Scientist and Sex, Art Review ISSN 1745-9303, Vol. XLIX, 2 pp. 64–5
- KELLY, B., LEVY, S. (1996) Music: An Accessory to the Crime. Paul Nougé and Surrealist Music, Aura ISSN 0968-1736, 20 pp. 97–116
- (1995) An Unholy Mission, Modern Painters ISSN 0953-6698, Vol. 8, No. 1, 3 pp. 61–63
- KELLY, B., LEVY, S. (1994) E.L.T. Mesens' Renouncement of Music, French Studies Bulletin ISSN 0262-2750, No. 52, 3 pp. 13–15
- (1994) Paul Nougé and Surreal Invention, New Comparison ISSN 0950-5814, No. 17, 15 pp. 120–134
- (1993 a) Magritte, Mesens and Dada, Aura ISSN 0968-1736, No. 1, 11 pp. 31 41
- (1993 b) Magritte: The Uncanny and the Image, French Studies Bulletin ISSN 0262-2750, No. 46, 3 pp. 15 17
- (1992 a) Magritte and Words, Journal of European Studies ISSN 0047-2441, Vol. 22, Part 4, No. 88, 19 pp. 313 321
- (1992 b) Magritte and the Surrealist Image, Apollo ISSN 0003-6536, Vol. CXXXVI, No. 366, 3 pp 117 119
- (1990) Foucault on Magritte on Resemblance, Modern Language Review ISSN 0026-7937, Vol. 85, No.1, 7 pp. 50 56
- (1987) Some Views on Metaphor: From Classical Rhetoric to Robbe Grillet, The Linguist ISSN 0268-5965, Vol. XXVI, No. 2, 3 pp. 66 68
- (1986) Linguistic Principles and Iconic Communication, Journal of Literary Semantics ISSN 0341-7638, Vol. XV, No. 3, 11 pp. 216 226
- (1985) From Language Loss to the Poetic Function, The Linguist ISSN 0268-5965, Vol. XXIV, No. 1, 4 pp. 45 48
- (1981) René Magritte and Window Display, Artscribe International ISSN 0309-2151, No. 28, 5 pp. 24 28

OTHER ARTICLES & SHORT TEXTS

- (2021) 'The recurring theme ...' in Modern British and Irish Art Day Sale (Christie's, London, 21 October 2021), 1 p. online [https://www.christies.com/lot/lot-6340357?ldp_breadcrumb=back&intObjectID=6340357&from=salessummary&lid=1 christies.com]{{dead link|date=September 2026|bot=medic}}{{cbignore|bot=medic}}
- (2021) 'Conroy Maddox' in The Mind’s Eye: Surrealist Sale (Bonham’s, London, 25 March 2021), 1 p. 130
- (2021) 'John Banting' in The Mind’s Eye: Surrealist Sale (Bonham’s, London, 25 March 2021), 1 p. 122
- (2019) 'Jeffrey Sherwin: Medic, Politician, Collector' in Outside In: The Dr Jeffrey Sherwin Collection (Christie’s, London, 21 November 2019), 1 p. 6
- (2019) 'This work belongs to a major phase...' in Modern Made (Lyon & Turnbull, London, 27 March 2019), 1 p. 113
- (2018) 'In 1967 Desmond Morris...' in Design and Modern Art (Mallams, Oxford, 6 & 7 December 2018), 1 p. 132
- (2017) 'Conroy Maddox (1912–2005) Anthropomorphic Landscape' in Modern British and Irish Art (Christie's, London, 27 June 2017), 1 p. 157
- (2016) 'Conroy Maddox (1912–2005) Conquest of the Irrational' in Modern/British Art Online (Christie's, London, 2 October 2016), 1 p.
- (2016) 'NPG x196215: Conroy Maddox', National Portrait Gallery website
- (2013) 'Conroy Maddox (1912–2005) The Terminus' in Modern British and Irish Art (Christie's, London, 16 October 2013), 1 p. 75
- (2013) 'Conroy Maddox (1912–2005) Cabinet des Merveilles; and Threatening Beetle' in Interiors (Christie's, London, 13 August 2013), 1 p. 46
- (2012) 'Conroy Maddox (British, 1912–2005) Departure of the Wayfarer, 1940' in 20th Century Art & Design (Mallams, Oxford, 12 December 2012), 1 p. 88
- (2012) 'Conroy Maddox (British, 1912–2005) On the Borderlands, 1937' in 20th Century Art & Design (Mallams, Oxford, 12 December 2012), 1 p. 88
- (2012) 'Conroy Maddox (1912–2005) The Treasure Trail, Mythical Figures' in Modern British and Irish Art (Christie's, London (14 December 2012), 1 p. 31
- (2012) 'Conroy Maddox (1912–2005) Flag Waving, Organic Threads' in 20th Century British Art (Christie's, London, 12 July 2012), 1 p. 34
- (2012) 'Conroy Maddox (1912–2005) Untitled' in 20th Century Art & Design (Mallams, Oxford, 23 May 2012), 1 p. 107
- (2011) 'Conroy Maddox (1912–2005) Atmospherics, Rendezvous' in 20th Century British Art (Christie's, London, 15 December 2011), 1 p. 52
- (2011) 'Conroy Maddox (1912–2005) Threatening Beetle' in 20th Century British Art (Christie's, London, 14 July 2011), 1 p. 58
- (2011) 'Leonora Carrington. Surrealist Painter and Sculptor who Found her Artistic and Spiritual Home in Mexico', The Independent ISSN 0951-9467, No. 7,684, 28 May 2011, 2 pp. 44–45
- (2009) 'The Second World War…' in 20th British Art (Christie's, London, 16 December 2009), 1 p. 42
- (2009) 'Seeing Blindness' in Open Windows an Exhibition of Surrealist Artworks by Patrick Hourihan (Gallery West-Eleven, London, 6–12 July 2009), 2 pp. 2–3
- (2008) 'Conroy Maddox (1912–2005)' in 20th British Art (Christie's, London, 16 July 2008), 1 p. 58
- (2008) 'Desmond Morris' in 20th British Art (Sotheby's, London, 18 March 2008), 1 p. 106
- (2008) 'Conroy Maddox' in 20th British Art (Sotheby's, London, 18 March 2008), 1 p. 111
- (2007) 'Conroy Maddox (1912–2005) The Stillness of the Day' in 20th British Art (Christie's, London, 27 June 2007), 1 p. 50
- (2007) 'Toni del Renzio Surrealist Artist', Yorkshire Post ISSN 0963-1496, 20 January 2007, 1 p. 10
- (2007) 'Toni del Renzio Enfant Terrible of English Surrealism', The Independent ISSN 0951-9467, No. 6,315, 12 January 2007, 1 p. 41
- (2006) 'Conroy Maddox (1912–2005) The Engaged Couple' in 20th Century British Art (Bonham's, London, 28 November 2006), 2 pp. 8–9
- (2006) 'Freud and Sculpture: Frozen Dynamism', catalogue supplement, Freud's Sculpture, Henry Moore Institute, Leeds, 2006, 10 pp. 1–10
- (2006) 'Conroy Maddox (1912–2005) The Stillness of the Day' in The Poetry of Crisis. The Peter Nahum Collection of British Surrealist and Avant-Garde Art 1930–1951 (Christie's, London, 15 November 2006), 1 p. 42
- (2006) 'Desmond Morris (B. 1928) Comparative Anatomy' in The Poetry of Crisis. The Peter Nahum Collection of British Surrealist and Avant-Garde Art 1930–1951 (Christie's, London, 15 November 2006), 1 p. 58
- (2006) 'Desmond Morris (B. 1928) Cat VI (Two Cats)' in The Poetry of Crisis. The Peter Nahum Collection of British Surrealist and Avant-Garde Art 1930–1951 (Christie's, London, 15 November 2006), 1 p. 58
- (2006) 'Desmond Morris (B. 1928) Entry to a Landscape' in The Poetry of Crisis. The Peter Nahum Collection of British Surrealist and Avant-Garde Art 1930–1951 (Christie's, London, 15 November 2006), 1 p. 59
- (2005) 'Is it the real Desmond Morris?', Desmond Morris. Surrealist Paintings (1949–2004), Alexander Clayton Art, Stratford upon Avon, 2005, 1 p. 1
- (2005) 'Magician Maddox Conjured up Surreal', The Birmingham Post, No. 45,081, 8 February 2005, 1 p. 9
- (2005) 'Conroy Maddox', The Times ISSN 0140-0460, No. 68,286, 17 January 2005, 1 p. 50
- (1999) 'Conroy Maddox English Surrealist', Conroy Maddox an English Surrealist (Mercer Art Gallery, Harrogate, 1999), 6 pp. 1–6
- (1997) 'Conroy Maddox The Surrealist Eye', Conroy Maddox The Surrealist Eye (The Market House, Ledbury, 1997), 1 p. 1
- (1994) 'Conroy Maddox: Commitment to Enigma', Conroy Maddox: Paintings and Objects (Gallery M, London, 1994), 3 pp. 2–4
- (1993) 'Marcel Mariën', The Independent ISSN 0951-9467, No. 2,170, 2 October 1993, 1 p. 45
- (1992) 'This is a Magritte', The Times Higher Education Supplement ISSN 0049-3929, No. 1,028, 17 July 1992, 1 p. 18
- (1984) 'Waterloo Script and the French Conventions of Letter Writing', University College Dublin Computer Centre Newsletter, Vol. 11, No. 1 (including program), 2 pp. 19–20

ARTICLES IN EDITED COLLECTIONS

- (2009) Maddox, Conroy Ronald (1912–2005), in Lawrence Goldman (Ed.) Oxford Dictionary of National Biography 2005–2008 (Oxford University Press, Oxford, 2013) ISBN 978-0-19-967154-0, 2 pp. 739–740; online edition, (Oxford University Press, January 2009) ISBN 978-0-19-861411-1
- KELLY, B., LEVY, S. (2001) Mesens, Edouard Léon Théodore in S. SADIE (Ed.) The New Grove Dictionary of Music and Musicians, second edition, Vol. 16, (Macmillan, London) ISBN 0333919513, 1 p. 479
- (1998 a) Le Surréalisme de Desmond Morris, in E. BURSSENS (Ed.) Scope 99 (Editions Labor, Brussels, Editions Martial, Paris) ISBN 90-5349-268-2, 1 p. 408
- (1998 b) Het Surrealisme van Desmond Morris, in E. BURSSENS (Ed.) Snoecks 99 (Snoeck-Ducaju & Zoon, Ghent) ISBN 90-5349-270-4, 1 p. 454
- (1995 a) Antigone: Play by Jean Anouilh, 1944 in L. HENDERSON (Ed.) Reference Guide to World Literature (St James Press, Detroit) ISBN 1-5586-2195-4, 2 pp. 43–4
- (1995 b) The Outsider (L'Etranger): Novel by Albert Camus, 1942 in L. HENDERSON (Ed.) Reference Guide to World Literature (St James Press, Detroit) ISBN 1-5586-2195-4, 2 pp. 225–6
- (1995 c) The Fall (La Chute): Novel by Albert Camus, 1956 in L. HENDERSON (Ed.) Reference Guide to World Literature (St James Press, Detroit) ISBN 1-5586-2195-4, 1 p. 225

== Scholarly Papers & Public Lectures ==
- 2026 ‘The Darkness of Angst: Meaning and Anti-Meaning in Emmy Bridgwater and Kay Sage’, University of Glasgow
- 2025 'Time Flower', Flatpack Festival, Birmingham
- 2025 'Mary Wykeham, quite contrary', The Hepworth Wakefield
- 2023 'René Magritte and Belgian Surrealism', Osher Institute, University of California San Diego
- 2019 'Conflict in the Wake of Surrealexeter 1967', University of Exeter
- 2018 'Surrealist Biological Distortion', St. Hugh’s College, Oxford
- 2017 'Conroy Maddox: Outside In Inside Out’, Aberystwyth University
- 2016 'Magritte the Saboteur', Waterstones, Piccadilly, London
- 2014 'Surrealism and the Street', Barber Institute, University of Birmingham
- 2014 'Surrealism', Abbot Hall Art Gallery, Kendal
- 2012 'Biomorphism as Ethology', Instituto Superior de Psicologia Aplicada, Instituto Universitário, Lisbon
- 2012 'Lewis Carroll and British Surrealism', Tate Liverpool
- 2012 'Biomorphism or Skeuomorphism: Surrealist distortion', University of Hull
- 2011 'Magritte's La Saveur des larmes', Tate Liverpool
- 2011 'Magritte. Le Refus de l'authentique', Le Centre Interdisciplinaire Récits Cultures Psychanalyse Langues et Sociétés de l'Université de Nice
- 2010 'Surrealism: the Ultimate Defiance', National Gallery of Scotland, Edinburgh
- 2010 'Surrealism', National Association of Decorative and Fine Arts Societies, Harrogate
- 2009 'Desmond Morris', University of Cambridge
- 2009 'Surrealism in Britain', University of Cambridge
- 2009 'Fleeting Phantom: Sheila Legge', Centre for Research in the Arts, Social Sciences and Humanities, University of Cambridge
- 2009 'What is Surrealism?', Leeds Art Gallery
- 2009 'Paul Nougé Constructing Absence', French Institute, Edinburgh
- 2008 'Surrealism: Anger and Revolt', University of Durham
- 2008 'Desmond Morris. Lines of Thought', Williamson Art Gallery and Museum, Birkenhead
- 2008 'Reading Magritte's La Saveur des larmes', The Barber Institute, University of Birmingham
- 2006 'Body Language: Communication and Identity', University of the Arts, Bremen
- 2005 'Magritte at the Edge of Codes', Conception Reception, Annual Conference, The Association of Art Historians, University of Bristol
- 2003 'Conroy Maddox', Chelsea Arts Club, London
- 2003 'Chasing Dreams: Freud and the Surrealists', University of Manchester
- 2002 'La Lumière de l'inconscient', Université catholique de l'Ouest, Angers
- 2002 'Surrealism', City Art Gallery, Southampton
- 2001 'The Surrealism of Maddox and Morris', Birmingham Museum and Art Gallery
- 2001 'Jean-Martin Charcot, a nineteenth-century influence', Le Surréalisme appartient-il au XXe siècle?, St. Hugh's College, Oxford
- 1998 'Psychoanalysis and the Surrealist Object', Identities, Annual Conference, The Association of Art Historians, University of Exeter
- 1997 'Surrealism and Desmond Morris', Charleston Literary Festival
- 1997 'Surrealism: an introduction', Ledbury Poetry Festival
- 1997 'Desmond Morris and Surrealism', Buxton Museum & Art Gallery
- 1997 'Edouard Mesens et la persistance du dadaïsme', La Littérature et les arts en Belgique francophone, University of Edinburgh
- 1997 'Sex and Surrealism', Whitworth Art Gallery, University of Manchester
- 1996 'René Magritte: The Space in Question', Research Seminar, Keele University
- 1996 'The Unknown Desmond Morris', City Museum and Art Gallery, Stoke-on-Trent
- 1996 'André Breton and the Belgian Connection', André Breton: The Power of Language, International Surrealist Colloquium, University of Glasgow
- 1995 'Conroy Maddox: The Philosophy of a Surrealist', Leeds City Art Gallery
- 1994 'Belgian Surrealist Theories of music', University of Reading (with Barbara Kelly)
- 1993 'Paul Nougé and Surrealist Music', Centre for Research in French Studies, University of Keele (with Barbara Kelly)
- 1993 Interview with Conroy Maddox, Surrealism: The Scene of the Crime, Eugène Vinaver International Colloquium University of Manchester
- 1993 'Dangerous Music: Belgian Theories of Musical Surrealism', The Scene of the Crime Colloquium, University of Manchester (with Barbara Kelly)
- 1993 'Belgian Surrealist Theories of Music', University of Liverpool (with Barbara Kelly)
- 1992 Panellist at Dissecting the exquisite corpse: Surrealism in Words and Images, Symposium, Institute of Romance Studies, University of London
- 1989 'The Theories of Paul Nougé', North-West, Universities' Seminar in French, University of Liverpool
- 1988 'Aspects of the Belgian Approach to Surrealism', University of Newcastle upon Tyne
- 1987 'Art Déco', Newcastle Polytechnic
- 1987 'Jean Cocteau', Tyneside Cinema, Newcastle upon Tyne
- 1987 'Surrealism on Film: The Movement and its Philosophy', series of three lectures, Merseyside Film Institute, Liverpool
- 1985 'The Paris 1920 Style', University of Liverpool
- 1985 'Jean Cocteau', Merseyside Film Institute, Liverpool
- 1984 'The Language of Literary Criticism: Structuralism and the Narrative', University College, Dublin
- 1984 'Dada and Surrealism', Trinity College, Dublin
- 1984 'Paul Nougé', University of Liverpool
- 1983 'Belgian Surrealism', National College of Art and Design, Dublin
- 1983 'Language Loss: A Linguistic Approach', Dublin Dyslexia Association
- 1983 'The Theory of Abstraction', National Institute for Higher Education, Dublin
- 1982 'Aphasic Models', University of Kent
- 1982 'Abstraction, Problems of Interpretation', University of Kent
- 1982 'René Magritte', Trinity College, Dublin

== Media ==
- 2022 Contributor Any Answers?, BBC Radio 4, 30 April 2022, 2.00-3.00 pm.
- 2020 Expert guest The Sadeq Show, Iran International Television, 11 June 2020, 3.00 pm.
- 2020 Live contributor Alfie and Anna at Breakfast, BBC Radio Newcastle, 20 March 2020, 7.00-10.00 am.
- 2007 Live contributor Ronnie Barbour, BBC Three Counties Radio, 9 March 2007, 5.00–6.00 pm.
- 2007 Contributor Brief Lives, BBC Radio 5 Live, 18 February 2007, 6.00–6.30 am.
- 2006 Live contributor Breakfast, BBC Radio Stoke, 21 September 2006, 7.45–8.00 am.
- 2005 Contributor Front Row, BBC Radio 4, 14 January 2005, 7.15–7.45 pm.
- 2002 Live contributor The Late Show, BBC Radio Nottingham, 30 October 2002, 10.30–11.00 pm.
- 2002 Contributor Brugse Radio VBRO (Belgium) 106 FM, 25 March-3 April 2002
- 2002 Live contributor Morning Show, Saga Radio, 1 February 2002, 10.30 am.
- 2000 Live contributor Night Waves, BBC Radio 3, 8 December 2000, 10.00–10.30 pm.
- 2000 Contributor Front Row, BBC Radio 4, 4 December 2000, 7.15–7.45 pm.
- 1996 Contributor Answers Back: Desmond Morris, BBC Radio Scotland
- 1995 Director, author & narrator Conroy Maddox: Surreal Enigmas, 16 minutes
- 1995 Contributor Performance, BBC Radio Stoke
- 1991 Contributor Mind Your Own Business, BBC Radio Stoke
- 1987 Interpreting for live stage performance by Antonio Fava, Commedia dell'arte
- 1986 Script translator Briefing: The Swiss Connection, Independent Television, 4 December 1986
