= John Small (British Army officer) =

British Army officer (1726–1796)

Major-General John Small
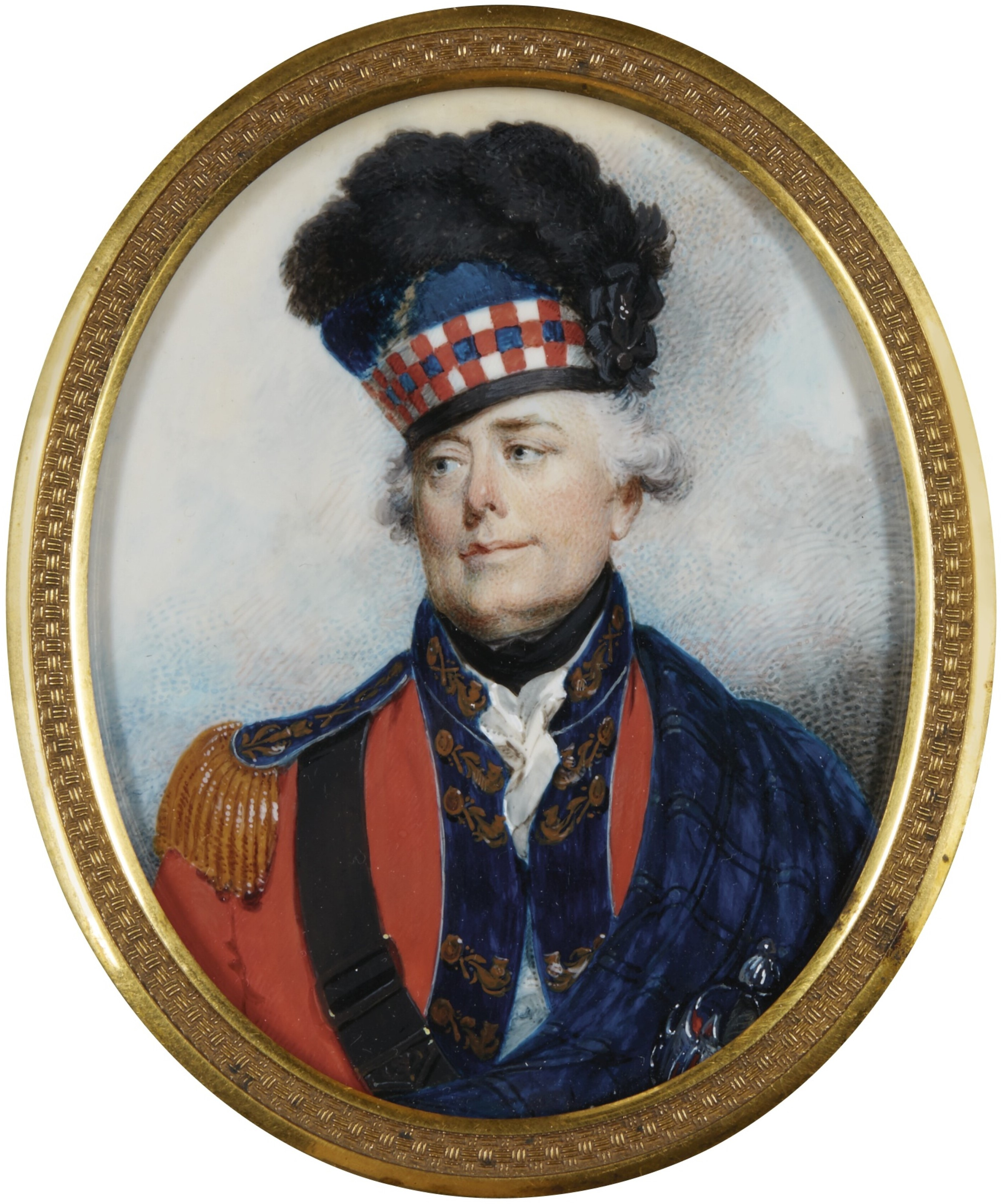
- Portrait by William Wood, 1796
- Born: 13 March 1726; Strathardle, Atholl
- Died: 17 March 1796 (aged 70); Saint Peter Port, Guernsey
- Burial place: Church of Saint Peter Port
- Military career
- Allegiance: Dutch Republic; Great Britain
- Branch: Dutch States Army; British Army
- Service years: –1796
- Rank: Major general (British Army)
- Units: Scots Brigade; 42nd Regiment of Foot; 21st Regiment of Foot
- Commands: 84th Regiment of Foot
- Conflicts: French and Indian War; Battle of Fort Oswego; Battle of Carillon; Montreal campaign; Seven Years' War; Invasion of Martinique (1762); Siege of Havana; American War of Independence; Battle of Bunker Hill

Major-General John Small (13 March 1726 – 17 March 1796) was a British army officer who served in the Seven Years' War and American War of Independence. During the latter war, he played a major role in raising and leading the 84th Regiment of Foot (Royal Highland Emigrants). Following the end of the American War of Independence in 1783, Small settled with many of the men of the 84th Regiment in Douglas Township, Hants County, Nova Scotia. He later returned to Britain. He was appointed as Lieutenant Governor of Guernsey and promoted to major general, continuing to serve in the army until his death in 1796.

== Early life ==
John Small was born on 13 March 1726 in the Atholl village of Strathardle, the son of Patrick Small and his wife Magdalen Small had two brothers: Alexander, who became a British Army surgeon, and James, who became a factor. At an early age, Small's family purchased a commission in the Dutch States Army's Scots Brigade, and he served with them in Holland. In 1747 a two-battalion regiment of the brigade was raised for service under Henry Douglas, Earl of Drumlanrig and Small joined the regiment at the rank of second lieutenant. In 1756 Small transferred to the British Army, purchasing a commission as a lieutenant in the 42nd Regiment of Foot just before its departure for North America to serve in the French and Indian War.

== Seven Years' War ==
Following his arrival in North America, Small fought at the Battle of Fort Oswego in August 1756. Taken prisoner, he was released and in August 1758 fought at the Battle of Carillon, which proved to be another British defeat. Following the battle Small accompanied Major-general Jeffery Amherst on his successful expedition to Lake Champlain in 1759. He also served under Amherst in the 1760 Montreal campaign. In Montreal, Small was placed in charge of the French prisoners of war and took them to the Province of New York. Amherst held Small in high regard and frequently used him "on particular services". In 1762 Small was promoted to captain and sailed with his regiment to take part in the invasion of Martinique and subsequently the British expedition against Cuba, both of which were successful.

Following the end of the Seven Years' War in 1763 Small was placed on half-pay but was almost immediately transferred to the 21st Regiment of Foot. When the 42nd Foot returned to Europe in 1767 most of the regiment's troops, who had previously volunteered to stay in North America, joined the 21st Foot in order to serve under Small who was "deservedly popular" with them. Small was appointed brigade major to British forces in North America in 1767 and returned to the region. During the interval between the Seven Years' War and American War of Independence Small possibly began to acquire his estate, Selmah Hall, in Nova Scotia. He later bequeathed part of it to his first cousin, friend and heir General John Reid. During this period, Small became interested in colonial American politics and befriended several politicians, including Joseph Warren.

== American War of Independence ==
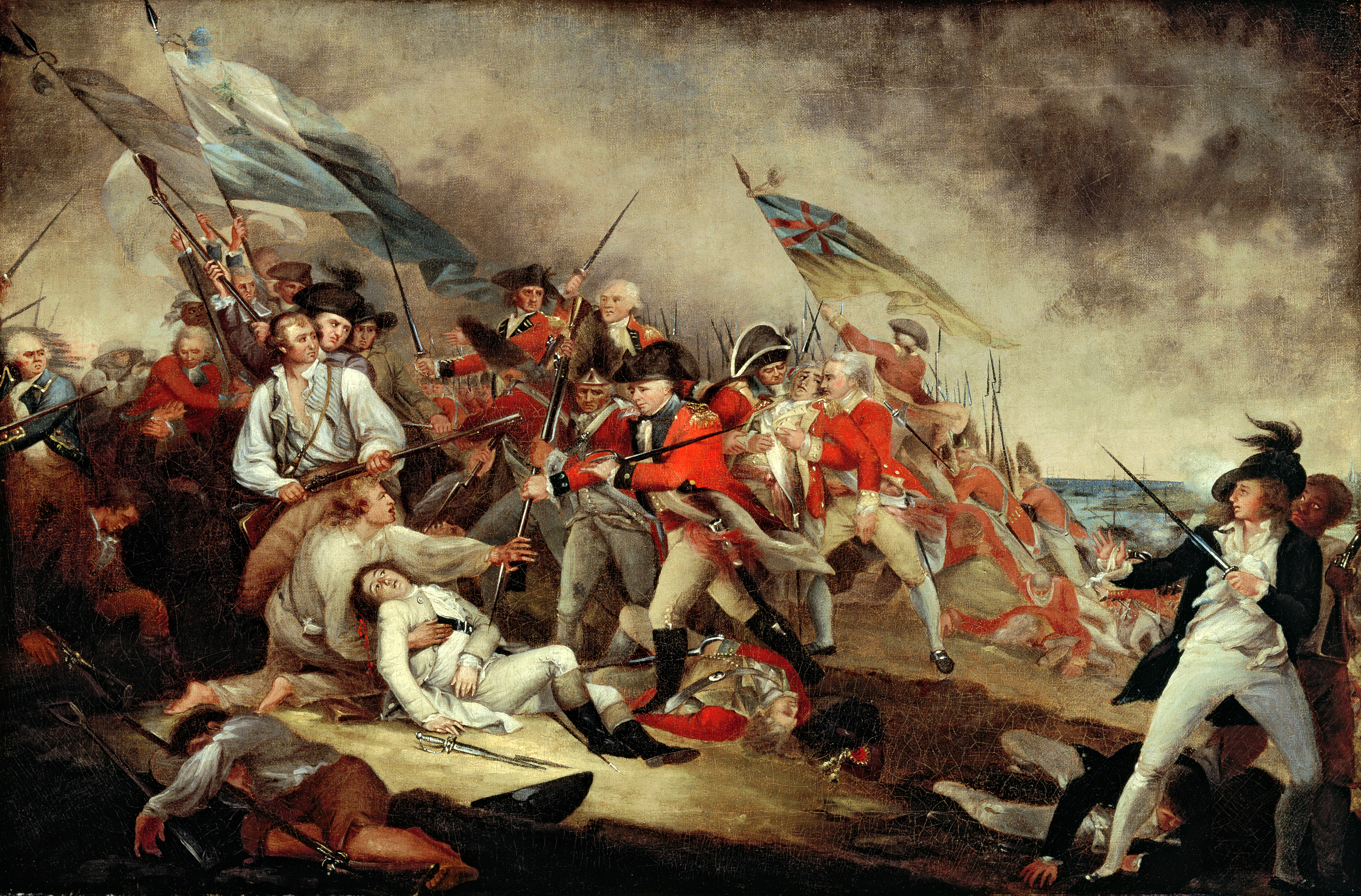
Small (with sword in hand) in The Death of General Warren at the Battle of Bunker Hill

In 1765, Small was placed in command of a company of the 21st Foot, serving with them throughout the American War of Independence. In 1775 he received an unofficial assignment from General Thomas Gage; promoted to the rank of major, Small was sent to Nova Scotia to raise at his own expense the Young Royal Highlanders, which was soon amalgamated into the 84th Regiment of Foot (Royal Highland Emigrants) as the 84th Foot's second battalion. As a brigade major Small fought at the first major battle of the war, the Battle of Bunker Hill, on 17 June 1775. During the battle Small along with three other members of the 84th Foot was wounded; in Small's case he was injured in the arm by American cannon fire.

Following the battle Small spent of the rest of the war in New York on staff duty as the commander of the 84th Foot's second battalion. After the war ended in 1783 the Crown issued veterans of the conflict land grants in Nova Scotia and other parts of Canada in lieu of pay to encourage British settlement in both regions. Veterans often settled together with members of their former units, and the 84th Foot's veterans settled in Douglas Township in Hants County, Nova Scotia, though some had lived there before the war. Small also lived there for a time, constructing a manor house known as Selmah Hall; Selma, Nova Scotia was named after his property.

== Later life and death ==
Small met the American artist John Trumbull in London in 1786 and possibly advised him when Trumbull was painting The Death of General Warren at the Battle of Bunker Hill. Trumbull painted Small at the centre of the action, holding a British grenadier's musket to prevent him from bayoneting Small's friend Joseph Warren. The American artist wanted to express the divisions that the conflict created between people who were friends yet were caught on opposite sides. In describing the painting for a catalogue of his works, Trumbull explained why he chose to emphasise Small's role, stating that Small "was equally distinguished by acts of humanity and kindness to his enemies, as by bravery and fidelity to the cause he served."

In 1793, Small was appointed as the Lieutenant Governor of Guernsey and was promoted to major general. He died on Guernsey three years later, on 17 March 1796. Small was buried within the church of Saint Peter Port. As Small never married, his principal heir was Reid, to whom he left an estate of 4,000 or 5,000 acres of land in Nova Scotia.

== See also ==
- The Soldiers' Trenches, Moor of Rannoch – a project led by Small's older brother

Government offices
Preceded by Sir James Craig	Lieutenant Governor of Guernsey; 1793-1796	Succeeded by Sir Hew Dalrymple
