= Finnart =

Coordinates: 55.95°N 4.79°W

- Location within Inverclyde
- OS grid reference: NS253767
- Council area: Inverclyde
- Lieutenancy area: Renfrewshire
- Country: Scotland
- Sovereign state: United Kingdom
- Post town: GREENOCK
- Postcode district: PA19
- Dialling code: 01475
- Police: Scotland
- Fire: Scottish
- Ambulance: Scottish
- UK Parliament: Inverclyde
- Scottish Parliament: Greenock and Inverclyde

The lands of Finnart to the west of Greenock belonged to the Earl of Douglas in medieval times. Around 1455 they were forfeited to the crown. Finnart was given to the Hamiltons, while the western part of the barony of Finnart went to Stewart of Castlemilk and became the barony of Finnart-Stewart, or Gourock.

Sir James Hamilton of Finnart inherited the barony and rose to high office, but was beheaded and his estates forfeited, with his Finnart lands going to Shaw of Sauchie and Greenock. These estates subsequently became the west end of Greenock. The northern part of the Finnart-Stewart estates forms the main part of modern Gourock, while the remainder now accommodates the housing estates of south-west Greenock.

== Location ==
The Douglas lands of Finnart lay west of the barony of Greenock, the boundary being "the Hole or West-burn": the burn is culverted under the modern town centre at Westburn Street, immediately to the west of The Oak Mall indoor shopping centre, and from there flows into the River Clyde which formed the northern boundary. The southern boundary was the glen leading to Inverkip; the West Burn flows down this valley, close to the line of the A78 trunk road. The area now includes Greenock West, as well as the Bow Farm housing estate.

The parish boundary with Gourock divided Easter Finnart from Finnart-Stewart (or Wester Finnart), which "extended from Achaneich to Achamead". The former Auchneagh House was sited adjacent to Fancy Farm, just to the west of the former municipal boundary: its location is marked by Auchneagh Road, which runs north west from the A78 Inverkip Road: the area is now a Greenock housing estate. The farms of Aughmead and West Aughmead were sited about 1 mile (1.6 km) further west. They lay to the west of Aughmead Road which runs north from Inverkip Road, and were in the area of the modern south-west Greenock housing estates of Larkfield and Braeside, which both lie to the south of the current boundary with Gourock itself. The Rev. Macrae's Notes About Gourock of 1880 includes a rough map showing the boundaries of Gourock estate including Auchneagh, Aughmead and Braeside, and extending over the Inverkip road as far as Loch Thom. The map shows the western boundary as the Mile Burn. The notes quote Crawfurd's 1782 History of the Shire of Renfrew referring to a walk-mill called "Elie-mill" as "lying within the barony of Gourock". The mill site lies a short distance to the east of West Aughmead farm, on the location of the modern street named Aileymill Gardens.

== History ==
The extensive landholdings of the Earl of Douglas included the lands of Finnart, which lay to the west of the barony of Greenock. As a result of disputes with King James II of Scotland, the lands and estates of James Douglas, 9th Earl of Douglas, were forfeited to the crown in 1455. In 1457 the king gave Finnart to the Hamilton family. The western portion of the Finnart estates was given by the king to Sir Archibald Stewart of Castlemilk, and subsequently became the barony of Finnart-Stewart, which had its seat at Gourock castle.

In 1510 James Hamilton, 1st Earl of Arran, passed the Finnart estate on to his natural son who became Sir James Hamilton of Finnart, though still widely known as "The Bastard of Arran". Finnart rose to a powerful place as head of the Hamilton family, and was appointed to a series of high positions by King James V of Scotland. In 1540 Finnart abruptly fell from favour with the king and was executed, with his lands forfeit to the crown. King James V then bestowed the lands of Finnart on Alexander Shaw of Sauchie and Greenock, who passed them together with the barony of Wester Greenock on to his son John Shaw in 1542. In 1669 his descendant John Shaw bought the barony of Easter Greenock from the Crawfords, and the conjoined baronies were inherited in 1752 by John Shaw Stewart. The lands remain under the Shaw Stewart baronets.
