= Charles Spalding =

Scottish confectioner and amateur diving bell designer

Spalding's Diving Bell, The Saturday Magazine, Vol. 14, 1839

Charles Spalding (29 October 1738 – 2 June 1783) was an Edinburgh confectioner and amateur engineer who made improvements to the diving bell. He died while diving to the wreck of the Belgioso in Dublin Bay using a diving bell of his own design.

== Early life ==
Charles Spalding was born in Canongate in Scotland on 29 October 1738, the son of Charles Spalding and Ann Findlay. His father was a bookseller in Canongate. As the son of a merchant, the younger Spalding eventually became a shop-lad.

Possessing a natural inclination towards mechanics, Spalding spent much of his free time as a youth exploring this interest. Spalding eventually became the proprietor of a sugar refining and confectionery shop across from the Royal Exchange on the Royal Mile in Edinburgh.

== Improvements to Halley's diving bell ==
Spalding's introduction to diving was more the result of necessity than choice. Heavily invested in the brig Peggy, Spalding suffered a severe financial blow when she sank en route to Scotland at the Farne Islands on 4 December 1774. Elected by his Edinburgh trade guild to recover as many goods as possible, Spalding came up with the idea of diving to the wreck.

The prevailing diving bell design in 1775 was that of Dr. Edmond Halley (1656–1742), who had computed the orbit of the comet named for him. Using his background in mechanics, Spalding read every book he could find on the design of Halley's diving bell, eventually proceeding to trial dives in the port of Leith, Dunbar Bay and at Dundee. Based on these trials, Spalding determined that Halley's design had weaknesses that added unnecessary risk to the divers. To correct the deficiencies, Spalding added a system of balance-weights to ease the raising and lowering of the bell, along with a series of ropes for signalling the surface crew. The redesigned diving bell weighed 200 lb (91 kg) and could accommodate two divers. Spalding also added ropes inside in the bell as seats and thick glass windows to admit light.

Spalding never recovered any of his own cargo from the wreck of the Peggy. However, in 1776 Spalding was recognised by The Society for the Encouragement of Arts, Manufactures and Commerce, London, with a nominal monetary award for his modified diving bell design.

With this success, Spalding founded Spalding & Co. of Edinburgh for his diving operations. Spalding was assisted in his diving efforts by his brother Thomas (born 1740), George Small, who was married to Spalding's sister Ann, and his nephew, Ebenezer Watson.

== HMS Royal George ==
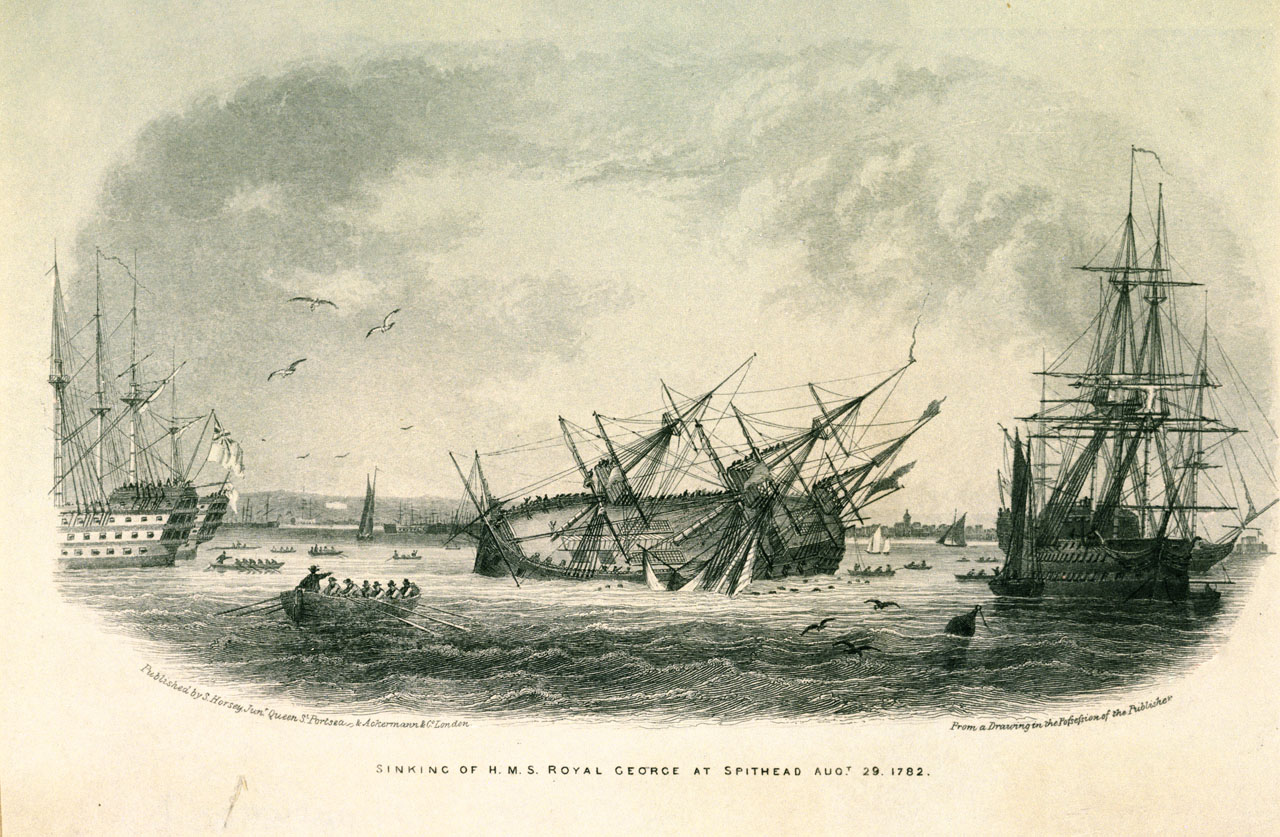
Sinking of HMS Royal George at Spithead, 1782

On 29 August 1782, the warship HMS Royal George capsized while under repairs and sank off Spithead, near the port of Portsmouth. HMS Royal George was the pride of King George III's navy and one of the last British Man-of-war to be primarily outfitted with more expensive bronze guns rather than iron. The ordnance alone was valued at £17,000.

One of the first people on the scene with a diving background was Thomas Spalding, Charles' brother. As a surgeon on an East Indiaman, Thomas happened to be in Portsmouth shortly after the sinking occurred. He immediately proposed to the Admiralty that he and his brother should be allowed to recover as much valuable stores and ordnance from the wreck as possible using his brother's diving bell design. The terms of the salvage arrangement were that Spalding would receive one-third of everything he recovered.

Thomas Spalding initially completed several reconnaissance dives before Charles arrived at the site on 2 October 1782 to begin diving. Charles worked on the wreck through most of October 1782 until the beginning of November. Spalding's dives were complicated by weather, the inexperience of the crew in working with the bell, and the amount of debris at the dive site. Overall, Spalding raised 15 guns from the wreck, 9 bronze and 6 iron. Spalding's proceeds from his salvage of HMS Royal George were approximately £400. Spalding later learned that the Admiralty had awarded William Tracey of Portsea, Portsmouth the salvage rights to the wreck for the following spring.

== The Belgioso ==
Charles Spalding Diving Bell, c. 1860

Undeterred, Spalding turned his attention to the wreck of the Belgioso.

In March 1783, the Belgioso or Count de Belgioso Imperial East Indiaman was sailing from Liverpool en route to China when it sank in a storm at Kish Bank near Dublin Bay in the Irish Sea. The cargo of the Belgioso was valued at £150,000, with £30,000 in silver and lead. The salvage terms agreed to by the owners were that Spalding would keep one-fourth of all silver and lead recovered and one-half of all other cargo. Additionally, if Spalding failed to recover anything, his entire expense for the operation would be defrayed.

Spalding and his nephew, Ebenezer Watson, arrived in Dublin in May 1783 to begin their dive preparations. On 1 June 1783 they began their dives, making three dives to 7 fathoms (42 ft) to the wreck. Typical for the start of a new project, the three dives were plagued with issues.

On the morning of 2 June 1783, Spalding and Watson resumed diving. Approximately one hour and fifteen minutes had elapsed when the dive crew became concerned. Two to three barrels of air had been sent down with no progress signal from the bell. Since the dive time was longer than usual, the dive crew proceeded to lift the bell. When the bell broke the surface they found both men dead, "Mr. Spalding reclining on his breast over one of the ropes that was stretched across for the purpose of sitting upon, and Mr. Watson sitting erect in the upper part of the bell".

On Sunday morning, 8 June 1783, Charles Spalding and Ebenezer Watson were laid to rest. The Irish press had chronicled Spalding's activity at the Belgioso wreck site, and Spalding had become somewhat of a local celebrity with the Irish citizens. Many influential Dublin citizens attended the funeral. In a tribute to Spalding's memory, the ships in Dublin Bay kept their flags lowered until the interment was completed. The pair were buried in a single grave in St. Mark's Churchyard in Dublin. The exact location of their grave within the churchyard is unknown.

An inquest into Spalding's and Watson's deaths was eventually held. The causes reviewed during the hearings varied from the negligence of the dive ship's captain, equipment failure, including tangled signal ropes or the failure of the final cask of air reaching the divers, diver error, putrified air from the rotting cargo of the Belgioso, even sabotage and alcohol. Dive experts today think the most plausible explanation is "a highly noxious effluvia entering the bell which could have come from the putrifying bodies or even the rotting cargo of ginseng plants in the cargo hold." This theory is consistent with the observation that they made no apparent attempt to make an emergency ascent. The exact cause of death of Spalding and Watson is unknown.

== Personal life ==
On 14 August 1768, Spalding married Susan Small, the daughter of James Small, factor of forfeited Struan estates in Perthshire, Scotland. Susan and her father were members of the Smalls of Dirnanean, Perthshire, Scotland.

At Spalding's death, he left a wife and seven children under the age of fourteen; the youngest being just six months old. A public subscription fund was opened in London for the relief of the family. Spalding's widow continued to operate the confectionery after his death, eventually selling the business and moving to Musselburgh, where she died on 31 October 1818.

Charles Falconer, Baron Falconer of Thoroton is a descendant of Charles Spalding, as is Sheila Legge, the "Surrealist Phantom" from the 1936 London International Surrealist Exhibition.
