= John Reid (British Army officer) =

British Army officer (1721–1807)

General John Reid
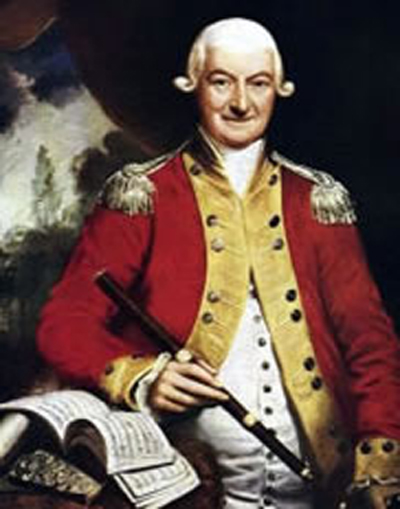
- Born: John Robertson; 13 February 1721
- Died: 6 February 1807 (aged 85); London, England

John Reid (born John Robertson; 13 February 1721 – 6 February 1807) was a British army general and founder of the chair of music at the University of Edinburgh.

Strongly connected to Edinburgh, he gives his name to the Reid School of Music, Reid Concerts, and Reid Orchestra.

== Early life ==
Born John Robertson, he changed his name from Robertson to Reid (the name given to his paternal ancestor on account of the colour of his red hair) on inheriting the Straloch estate in Perthshire from his father. He was the son of Alexander Robertson of Straloch, whose forefathers had for three centuries been known as the Barons Ruadh, Roy or Red, though the family name had remained Robertson, a tradition not followed by the General. Reid's father, Alexander Robertson, took an active part and incurred heavy losses in resisting the Jacobite rising of 1745. He was of the same stock as the Robertsons of Struan, Matilda, the granddaughter of Duncan, third Baron of Struan, having married John 'Reid' Robertson of Straloch, and obtained a charter of the lands of Straloch from James II of Scotland in 1451.

John Reid was born on 13 February 1721, and was educated at Edinburgh University. When Lord Loudoun's regiment of highlanders was raised, after the Battle of Fontenoy, he received a commission in it (8 June 1745) as lieutenant, his name being shown as John Robertson or Reid of Straloch. Subsequently, he adopted exclusively the surname of Reid.

== Military service ==
He served with the regiment against the Jacobite rebels of 1745, and was with that part of it which captured the troops landed in Tongue Bay from the sloop Hazard on 25 March 1746. These troops, belonging to the French service, but mainly Irish in nationality, numbered about 170, while their captors were only half that strength. The credit of this achievement was claimed by Lord Reay and his sons, one of whom was a captain in Loudoun's regiment: but, in a memorial to Lord Amherst, Reid affirmed many years afterwards, and brought some evidence to show, that it was really due to him. When his superior officers, considering the enemy too strong, had retired, he had persuaded some of the men to remain with him; and at the risk of a court-martial he had persisted in the attacks which at length forced the enemy to surrender. About £12,000 of money was taken, and the loss of this at a time when the Jacobite army was otherwise destitute was, according to Francis Farquharson, who commanded a regiment in that army, 'the chief cause of taking that desperate resolution of engaging the king's army at Culloden'.

Reid served with his regiment in Flanders in 1747–8, and took part in the defence of Bergen op Zoom. When peace was made in 1748 the regiment was reduced, and Reid bought a commission as captain-lieutenant in the 42nd Highlanders on 26 June 1751. He became captain 3 June 1752, and major 1 August 1759. He served in the expedition against Martinique under Colonel (afterwards General) Robert Monckton in January 1762, and in command of the 1st battalion of the 42nd he took a prominent part in the attack on the French positions on the Morne Tartanson (24 January), and was himself wounded in two places. On 3 February he was made brevet lieutenant-colonel.

In the same year he was at the siege of Havana, which lasted two months, and cost his battalion heavy losses from sickness. In October the 42nd went to British North America, having been reduced to one battalion. In 1764 Reid was second in command in Bouquet's expedition against the western and Ohio Indians, which followed on Pontiac's Rebellion. In 1770, after nearly twenty years in the 42nd, he was placed on half-pay. On 29 Aug. 1777 he was promoted colonel, and on 19 October 1781 major-general. When some new regiments were added to the establishment on account of French intervention in the war between Great Britain and the American colonies, he raised one, the 95th Foot of which he was colonel from 7 April 1780 till 31 May 1783, when it was disbanded. Reid became lieutenant-general 12 October 1793, and on 27 November 1794 he was made colonel of the 88th Foot (Connaught Rangers).

In the previous July he had written to Lord Amherst, the commander-in-chief under whom he had served in America asking for the colonelcy of a regiment not liable to be reduced after the war, and setting forth in detail, perhaps with some exaggeration, his past services and the losses he had sustained. He had acquired, chiefly by purchase, about 35,000 acres (140 km^{2}) of land in Vermont, and had erected mills and made other improvements. But the land had been forcibly seized by settlers from New England in 1774, and the outbreak of the war had deprived him of a remedy.

He became general 1 January 1798, and died in the Haymarket, London, 6 February 1807.

== Musical career and legacy ==
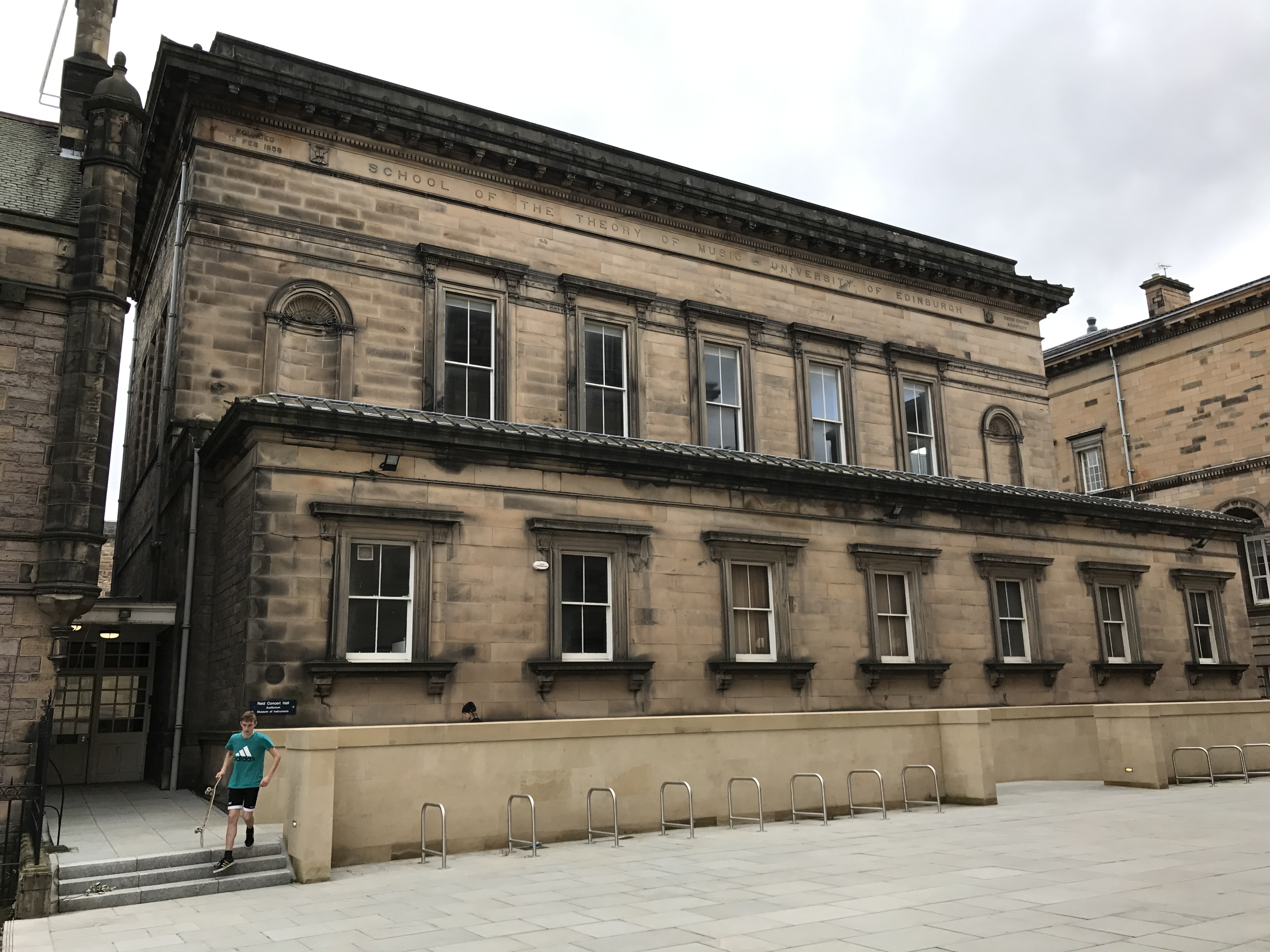
The Reid School of Music (now the Reid Concert Hall) was named after John Reid in 1859

Reid was a proficient flute-player and a musical composer. His compositions include an introduction, pastorale, minuet, and march, probably written for flute and bass. They were orchestrally arranged by Sir Henry Bishop. Twelve marches by Reid were arranged for a full band of wind instruments by P. Winter in the early part of the nineteenth century.

Reid's composition also include a series of slow marches composed for specific regiments, perhaps at the request of the regimental colonels. The best known of these is the march known as "The Garb of Old Gaul" composed by Reid for the 42nd Regiment (Black Watch) possibly around 1756. The patriotic words are said to have been added by Sir Harry Erskine a few years later. The tune remains the regular slow march of the Scots Guards and other Scottish regiments.

Thanks in part due to a large estate left to him by his cousin John Small, Reid left a fortune of more than £50,000. Subject to the life-interest of his only daughter, who had married a Mr. Robertson without his consent, he left this money to found a professorship of music in the University of Edinburgh, and to be further applied to the purchase of a library, or otherwise laid out in such a manner as the principal and professors of the university might think proper.

Accordingly, in 1839, after the daughter's death, the chair of music was founded. The fund had increased by that time to about £70,000; but the university authorities largely availed themselves of the discretion given to them in the application of the money. They diverted the bulk of it from the primary object to the further uses mentioned in Reid's will, and they fixed the professor's salary at £300, the minimum which he had named. John Thomson was the first professor, and Sir Henry Bishop the second (from 1841 to 1844). The salary was increased after an agitation by Mr. John Donaldson, who became professor in 1845. The Reid School of Music in Edinburgh, opened in 1859, bears the inscription "Endowed by General Reid".

Reid directed in his will that a concert should be annually given on his birthday, and should begin with pieces of his own composition. A subsequent ordinance of the Scottish Universities Commission abolished this concert, but directed that one of the series of winter concerts should, if possible, take place on Reid's birthday, and include some of his compositions. Two of Reid's compositions were included in Battle of the Forks, an arrangement of writings and music commissioned by the Renaissance and Baroque Society of Pittsburgh to commemorate the 250th anniversary of the Battle of Fort Duquesne. It premiered on 27 September 2008 at Synod Hall in Pittsburgh.
