= Factor (Scotland) =

Scottish term for a person or firm that manages property

In Scotland a factor (or property manager) is a person or firm charged with superintending or managing properties and estates—sometimes where the owner or landlord is unable to or uninterested in attending to such details personally, or in tenements in which several owners of individual flats contribute to the factoring of communal areas.

Factors can be found in solicitors' firms, or employed by chartered surveyors, property companies or building firms. Property factoring has a wide range of responsibilities and roles. Typically, a person would encounter a factor when renting property or subcontracting for a building firm.

== Duties ==
A factor deals with managing real property for the ultimate owner.

A factor could also be expected to deal with property repair, maintenance, cleaning, landscaping and snow removal, to be coordinated with the landlord's wishes. Such arrangements may require the factor to collect rents, service charges and pay necessary expenses and taxes, making periodic reports to the owner, or the owner may simply delegate specific tasks and deal with others directly.

A factor will often employ the services of a property services company to carry out the duties associated with the upkeep of the property (e.g. garden care, stair cleaning, car parking, etc.).

== The Highland factor in history ==
Highland factors played an influential role during the 18th and 19th centuries. They were the implementers and, often, designers of the improvement programmes that gave rise to the first phase of the Highland clearances, they managed famine relief, including during the Highland potato famine, they organised evictions and 'assisted passages' during the second phase of the clearances, they gave evidence to government enquiries such as the Napier Commission, and they were the object of much of the protest during the crofters' war in the 1880s.

In the 17th century, Highland landowners with large estates typically used a family member to carry out the management. This was essentially a role of maintenance: collecting rents, negotiating leases (tacks) and dealing with the ordinary population of the estate. When agricultural improvement got underway in the latter part of the 18th century, new skills were required: an understanding of the latest ideas in agronomy, business acumen, together with accounting and legal knowledge. Combining these in one person created the role of the Highland factor. In addition to the technical skills, he needed to be a person of sufficient social standing to deal with larger tenants and to act as representative of the landowner in local society.

Given the size of many Highland estates, and the remote and inaccessible locations under the charge of a factor, the job required substantial physical stamina. A twenty-mile (thirty-kilometre) round trip on foot would not be unusual. Duties had to be performed in all weathers; when Patrick Sellar went to collect rents and issue eviction notices in the winter of 1813–1814, one of his guides lost several toes to frostbite in the severe conditions. Alcoholism could be the result of the isolation that a Highland factor endured, together with the unrelenting hard work. The physical and mental health of many brought an early end to their careers. However, the job was well paid, with a typical salary being £200 per annum in the middle of the 19th century, with some earning twice that amount. In addition most factors would be provided with a house and a home farm to run for their own profit (thereby giving an example of the latest agricultural methods to the tenants). (Note: A clue to the value of a farm to run for their own profit can be seen from the auction sale adverts following the death of Francis Suther, the Sutherland estate factor who succeeded Patrick Sellar. Newspaper adverts in the Inverness Courier and Caledonian Mercury in April 1825 list 70 young cattle, 6 milk cows and calves, 2 riding ponies, and a 3-year-old filly.)

Highland factors had immense power over the populations that they lived within. The security of tenure of many Highland tenants was poor (though some had longer leases that put them in a slightly better position). This caused a fear of eviction, to the extent that, at the time of the crofters' war, a speaker at a land reform meeting said "I am ashamed to confess it now that I trembled more before the factor than I did before the Lord of Lords". Factors were generally despised by the communities in which they lived, even after the clearances had ceased. The Gaelic-speaking tenants would blame the factor for unpopular policies, but often would not criticise the landowner whose instructions he was following. This tied in with the peasantry clinging to the old values of Highland life, such as dùthchas, something that was steadily abandoned by the ruling classes as their estates became commercialised.

The large landholdings in the Highlands meant that only a small group of people were needed to fill all the positions. Those who were able to take this career path were usually trained by working under the direction of an experienced factor. Many sons followed their fathers into factorship, thereby saving some of the costs of training. Those without a family background often came from accountancy or the legal profession.

The opinions of factors on their work are available from a few published accounts. In the main era of clearance, Patrick Sellar emphatically made the case for the changes made under him and on other estates – an opinion from which he never deviated. He felt that his own family had benefited from the clearance of his grandfather (who had been a stonemason), starting the Sellars on a path of upward mobility. In a later generation of factors, Evander McIver steadfastly criticised the existence of overcrowded crofting communities that had been created in the first phase of the clearances. He believed that the economic system was flawed, with neither the estate nor the crofters able to make a decent income from the resources available. This was a widely held view among post-clearance factors, so explaining their support of emigration programmes from the congested districts. (Note: "Congested districts" was the term applied to the overcrowded crofting communities. Here you would find that no-one had enough land to grow the food they needed or produce a surplus for sale. Some government help was made available to deal with this problem through the Congested Districts Board (Scotland), with limited success.)

== See also ==
- Factor (agent) for mercantile and colonial factors
- Property manager for a general discussion on the background to property management
- Solicitor for an explanation of the role of a solicitor
- Property for a general article on property
