= James Wallace =

James Wallace may refer to:

== Sports ==
- Jim Wallace (footballer) (born 1954), Scottish footballer for Dunfermline Athletic, Aldershot and Alloa Athletic
- James Wallace (English footballer) (born 1991), English footballer for Fleetwood Town
- James Wallace (footballer, fl. 1928–1931), Scottish football defender for Burnley
- James Wallace (footballer, born 2000), Scottish footballer
- Jamie Wallace (born 1999), Canadian field hockey player
- Jim Wallace (rugby league), rugby league footballer of the 1920s for Great Britain, England, and St. Helens Recs
- Jim Wallace (baseball) (1881–1953), baseball player
- Bo Wallace (baseball) (James Alfred Wallace, 1929–2000), American baseball player

== Politicians ==
- James M. Wallace (1750–1823), United States Congressman from Pennsylvania
- James Wallace (British politician) (1729–1783), British Member of Parliament for Horsham, Attorney-General
- Jim Wallace, Baron Wallace of Tankerness (1954–2026), Deputy First Minister of Scotland for 1999–2005
- James P. Wallace (1928–2017), Justice of the Supreme Court of Texas
- James Wallace (Australian politician), NSW MLA

== Musicians ==
- James Wallace, American musician, lead singer of James Wallace & the Naked Light
- James "Bo" Wallace, American musician, former bassist for metal band Iced Earth
- Scruffy Wallace, bagpipe player for Celtic Punk band Dropkick Murphys

== Other people ==
- James Wallace (benefactor) (1821–1885), namesake of German Wallace College, Berea, Ohio
- James Wallace (botanist) (died 1724), Scottish physician and botanist
- James Wallace (businessman) (born 1937), New Zealand businessman, arts patron, and convicted sex abuser
- James Wallace (mathematician) (died 1850), Irish-born American mathematician and Catholic priest
- James Wallace (minister) (1642–1688), Scottish topographer
- James Wallace (Royal Navy officer) (1731–1803), Commodore Governor for the Canadian province of Newfoundland and Labrador
- James D. Wallace (1937–2019), American moral philosopher
- James Maxwell Wallace (1785–1867), British Army officer
- Jim Wallace (Australian activist), former commander of the Australian Special Air Service Regiment and current Managing Director of the Australian Christian Lobby
- Jimmy Wallace (1937–2007), English footballer
- James Warner Wallace or J. Warner Wallace (born 1961), American homicide detective and Christian apologist

== Other uses ==
- James Wallace (novel), a 1788 novel by Robert Bage

== See also ==
- James Wallis (disambiguation)
