= James Small (Scottish laird) =

James Small in cap with clan badge

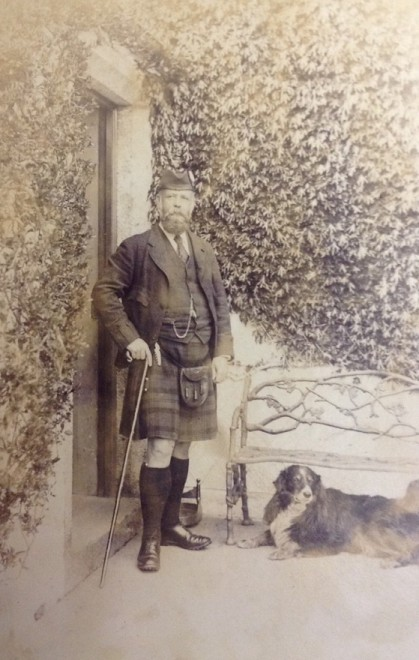
James Small, 1884

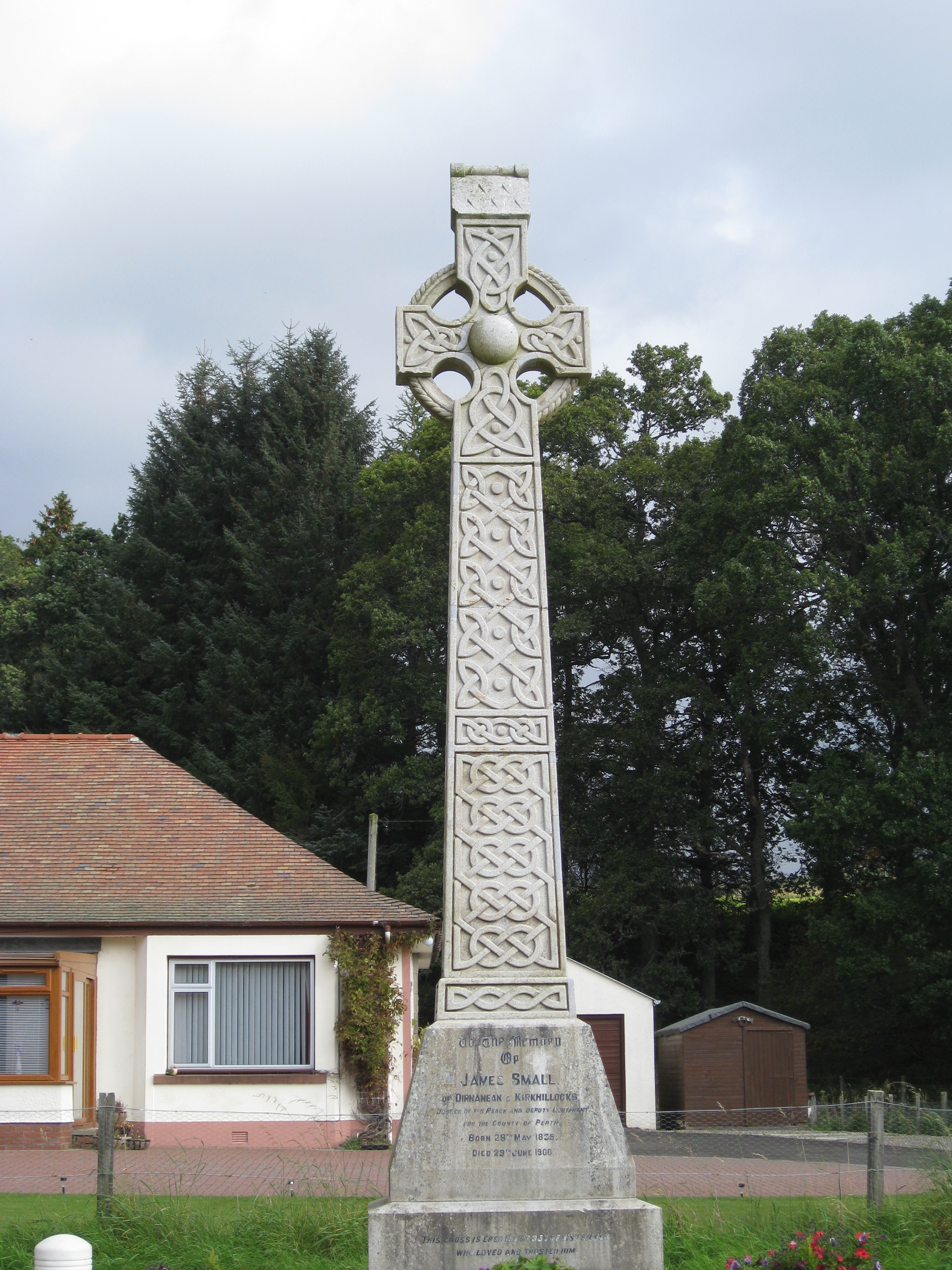
The James Small Monument

James Small (28 May 1835 – 25 June 1900) was a Justice of the Peace and Deputy Lieutenant for the County of Perth, Scotland and the Laird of Dirnanean.

James Small was born on 28 May 1835 in Perthshire, Scotland, the son of Patrick Small and Amelia Rattray of Kirkhillock and Brewlands. Upon his father's death in 1859, Dirnanean passed to James, the ninth time the estate had passed from father to son since the 1588 charter by John, the 5th Stewart Earl of Atholl had granted the lands of Dirnanean to the Small family.

On 15 January 1867, at Chalton Church, Chalton, Hampshire, England, James married Janet Clarke-Jervoise, the second daughter of Sir Jervoise Clarke-Jervoise, 2nd Baronet (1804 – 1 April 1889). The couple had no children to inherit Dirnanean, so James' nephew, James Small Pender was designated his heir.

James served as the Justice of the Peace and Deputy Lieutenant for the County of Perth, Scotland. Small served as the head of Kirkmichael's school board, chieftain of the Strathardle Highland Gathering, president of the local horticultural society and chaired a host of other committees. He was also a member of the Atholl Highlanders.

For many years James was patron, with his neighbors the Keirs of Kindrogan House, of the Dow Bursaries at Saint Andrews University.

James died on 25 June 1900 and is buried in Kirkmichael Churchyard.

In honor of his service to the Perthshire area, the community erected the James Small (1835–1900) of Dirnanean monument at the junction of the A924/B950. The monument is a highly ornate Celtic cross. In December 2006, the memorial was toppled over by an errant motorist and fractured into a dozen pieces. In 2010 the memorial was repaired by the Perth and Kinross Council at a cost of £35,000. As part of the repairs, the memorial was relocated to the side of the road to provide additional protection.
