= Sydney Frederick Williams =

British Army general

Brigadier-General Sydney Frederick Williams CMG
- Born: 29 December 1866
- Died: 12 May 1942 (aged 75); London, England
- Military career
- Allegiance: United Kingdom
- Branch: British Army
- Rank: Brigadier-General
- Commands: Royal Engineers, Chief Engineer, 1916–1918
- Conflicts: First World War
- Awards: Companion of the Order of St Michael and St George, 1916

Brigadier-General Sydney Frederick Williams CMG (29 December 1866 – 12 May 1942) was a British Army officer.

== Background ==
Sydney Frederick Williams was born 29 December 1866, the son of the Rev. Stephen Frederick Williams, the Rector of Cold Norton, Essex, England. and his wife, Carolyn Sydney. He was baptized on 27 February 1867 in Bromborough, Cheshire, England. Williams was educated at Haileybury entering there in 1880, and leaving in 1885.

On 17 November 1896 at St. Mary's Episcopal Cathedral, Edinburgh, Williams married May Grant Gwyer, the daughter of Cecil Francis Gwyer and Mary Stewart Mitchell of Edinburgh, Scotland. Her father's family were merchants in St. Petersburg, Russia. Through her mother, May was a member of the Smalls of Dirnanean. The couple lived at 1 Thurloe-court, Chelsea, London most of their married life.

Williams died in London on 12 May 1942.

== Military career ==
After completing his education at Haileybury, Williams entered the Royal Engineers on 18 February 1886. He was promoted to captain in 1896, Lieutenant-Colonel in 1913 and colonel in 1918. He was elevated to Brigadier General in 1919 after serving as Chief Engineer between 1916 and 1918. In 1916 he was awarded the Companion of the Order of St Michael and St George.
