= Dirnanean House =

Manor house in Perth and Kinross, Scotland

Coordinates: 56.7537°N 3.5299°W

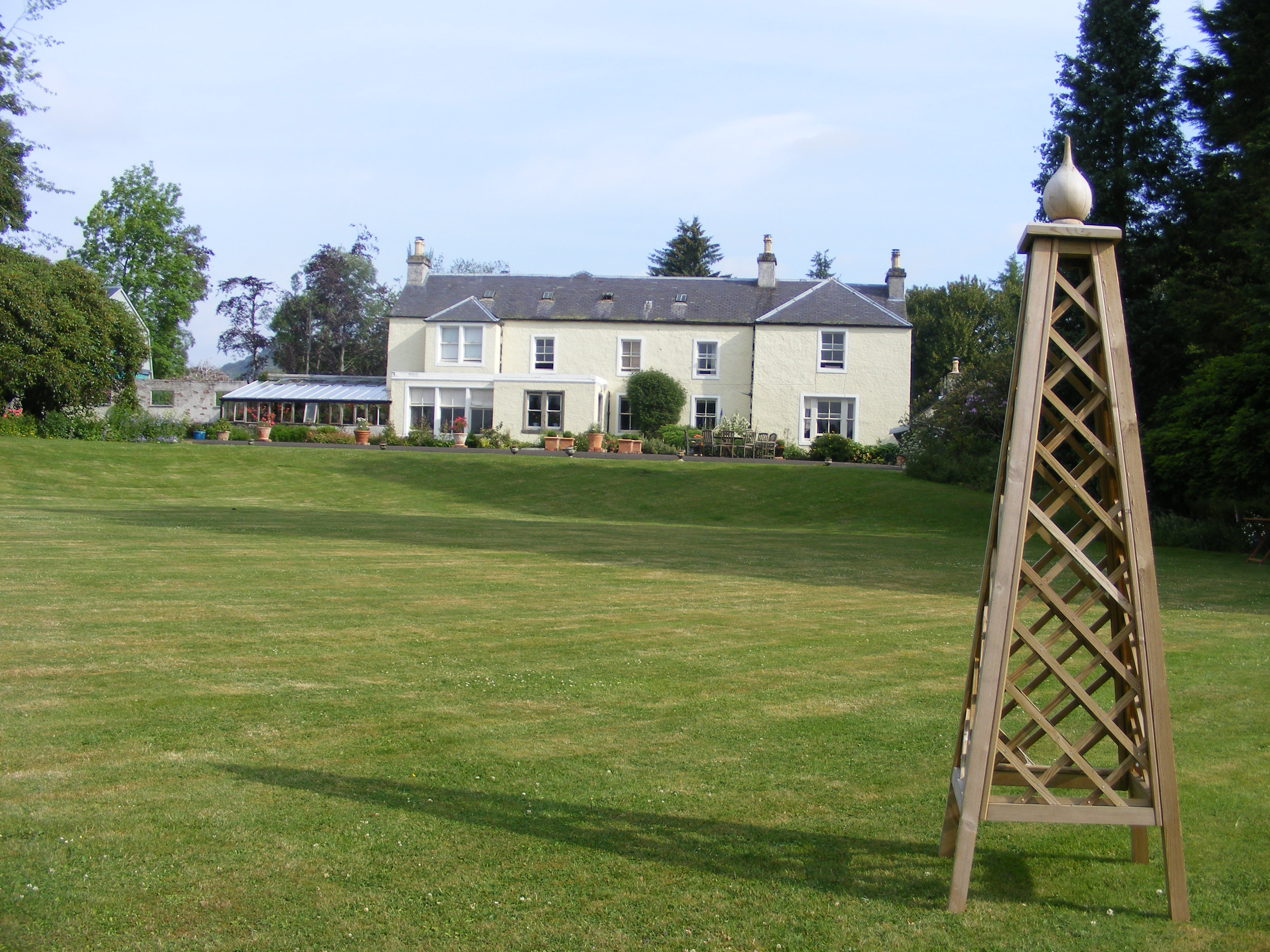
Dirnanean Manor House

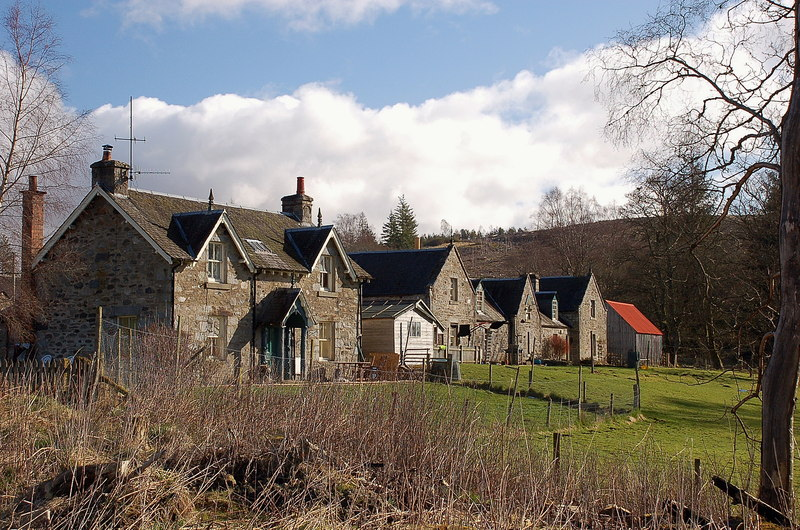
Home Farm at Dirnanean

Dirnanean House is part of a private, traditional Highland estate located near Enochdhu in Moulin parish, Blairgowrie, Perth and Kinross, Scotland, 10 miles ENE of Pitlochry. The Dirnanean estate is situated adjacent to the 64-mile waymarked Cateran Trail.

Dirnanean's steading house, lime kiln and shepherd's house are all Category B listed buildings.

The name Dirnanean is likely a derivation of Gaelic term Dur-nan-eun meaning "the birds' water" or alternately, but similarly, Doire nan Eun meaning "bird grove".

== History of the Estate ==
A 1588 charter record states that Andrew Small was granted the lands of Dirnanean in Strathardle by John, the 5th Stewart Earl of Atholl. By the time James Small (1835–1900) inherited the estate on the death of his father, Patrick, Dirnanean had been passed from father to son for nine generations. When James Small died without a direct heir, the ownership of Dirnanean transitioned to a series of his nephews until Francis Keir Balfour, the owner of neighbouring Kindrogan House, purchased the estate in 1926. A distant Small family cousin through his mother, Amelia Jane Keir, Francis Keir Balfour continued the Small family ownership of Dirnanean into the 1970s.

In 1790, the musician Robert Petrie of Kirkmichael (1767–1830) published several Highland music pieces with "Mrs. Small of Dirnanean" in their title. The compositions were published in "Petrie's Collection of Strathspey Reels & County Dances".

Dirnanean is now privately owned by a non-relative.

=== Smalls of Dirnanean ===
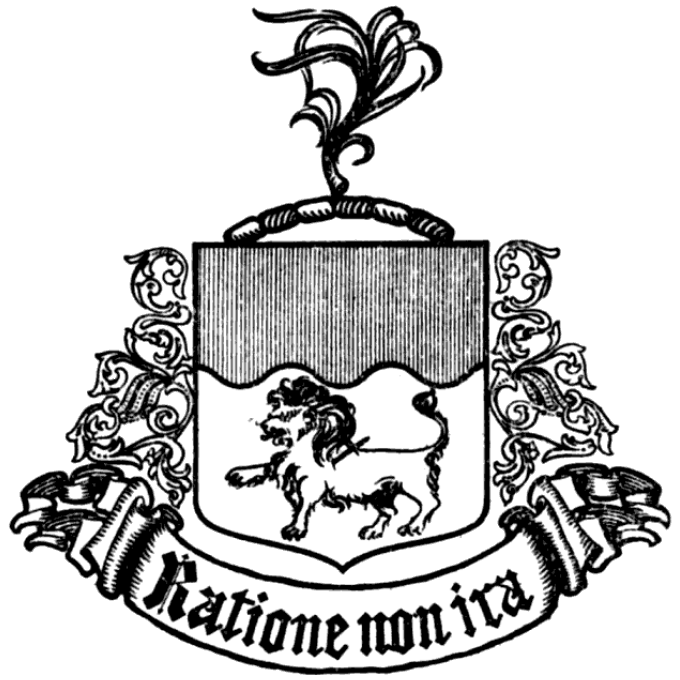
Small coat of arms

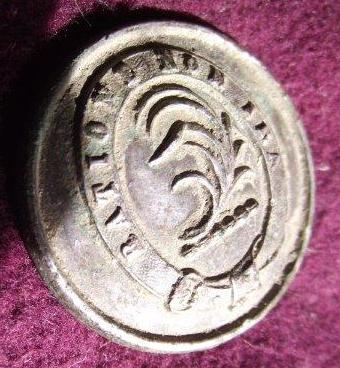
Small family button

The Smalls are a sept of the Scottish Clan Murray of Atholl.

The Small family coat of arms is described as "Per fesse wavy, gules and argent, a lion passant sable, pierced through with a dagger in bend proper entering at the shoulder, hilted or", which translates to: divided in half horizontally (in the manner of a fess or band), wavy, gules (red) and argent (silver), a lion walking with a forepaw raised, sable (black), pierced through with a dagger, in bend, proper entering at shoulder, hilted, gold.

The Small family motto is "Ratione non ira", which translates to "Do not anger". The Small family crest is branch of palm, properly erect. A gold button bearing an erect palm surrounded by the Small family motto was recently dug up in a garden plot on the Dirnanean estate.

A number of notable individuals are descendants or related by marriage to the Smalls of Dirnanean.

- Rev. Robert Blair, Scottish minister
- Duncan Cameron, owner of The Oban Times newspaper and inventor of The "Waverley" nib pen
- Mary Cameron, Scottish painter
- General Sir Archibald Campbell, 1st Baronet, GCB, administrator of the colony of New Brunswick, Canada
- General Sir John Campbell, 2nd Baronet, Campbell Baronetcy of New Brunswick, Canada
- Sir Conrad Laurence Corfield, British official and a political secretary of Lord Mountbatten
- Sir Eric Norman Spencer Crankshaw, KCMG CMG MBE, English cricketer, military officer and civil servant
- Alfred Henchman Crowfoot, Dean of Quebec, 1927–1947
- Brigadier John Cecil Currie DSO** MC, British Army Officer during WWII
- William Purdie Dickson, Professor of Divinity at the University of Glasgow
- Daniel Dow, traditional Scottish musician and composer
- Charles Falconer, Baron Falconer of Thoroton
- Sir John Ireland Falconer, former Lord Provost of Edinburgh, 1944–1947
- Mrs. Alexander Fraser, aka Caroline Rosetta Small Fraser, Victorian novelist
- Sir Reginald Michael Hadow, British diplomat
- Abdol Hossein Hamzavi, an Iranian diplomat, author and representative to the United Nations
- Arthur Charles Lestoc Hylton-Stewart, organist of St. George's Chapel, Windsor Castle
- Sir Archibald Hope, Scottish judge styled Lord Rankeillor
- Sir John Hope, 2nd Baronet Hope of Craighall, Scottish judge styled Lord Craighall
- Sir Thomas Hope, 1st Baronet Hope of Craighall, Advocate to Charles I
- Dr. James W. Inches, former Police Commissioner of Detroit, Michigan
- Dr. James Inglis, physician, author and geologist
- Frederick Schomberg Ireland, amateur cricketer and lawyer
- George Ireland, one of the founders of Ireland Fraser & Co.
- John Frederick Ireland, amateur cricketer
- Sheila Legge, Surrealist performance artist
- John Lodwick, British novelist
- Flora Macaulay, editor of The Oban Times Newspaper
- John MacDonald of Garth, Canadian fur trader
- Rolland Macdonald, Canadian lawyer and judge
- James Macgregor, (1808–1858), British politician and businessman
- William McGillivray, Canadian fur trader
- Andrew Munro, fellow, lecturer in mathematics and bursar at Queens' College, Cambridge
- Sir William Nairne, Lord Dunsinane, 5th Baronet of Nairne
- Monica Poole, English wood-engraver
- Dr. Charles Ransford, Fellow at the Royal College of Physicians, Edinburgh and early advocate of homoeopathy
- Patrick Robertson, British politician and businessman
- Alexander Small, Scottish army surgeon and correspondent of Benjamin Franklin
- Charlotte Small, early Canadian explorer
- Henry Beaumont Small, Canadian civil servant and author
- James Small, Factor of forfeited Straun Estates
- James Small, Laird of Dirnanean
- Major-General John Small, (1726–1796), active in the American Revolutionary War
- Dr. John Small, (1823–1879), British Deputy Surgeon General
- John Small, (1828–1886), Librarian of Edinburgh University for 32 years
- Lt. Col. John James Snodgrass, (1796–1841), British military officer and author
- Charles Spalding, (1783–1783), Edinburgh confectioner and improver of the diving bell
- General the Hon. Sir Augustus Almeric Spencer, G.C.B., third son of Sir Francis Spencer, 1st Baron Churchill
- The Reverend Canon Henry Spencer Stephenson, M.A. (1871–1957), Chaplain to King George VI and Queen Elizabeth II
- Joan V. Stiebel, MBE, Jewish refugee worker
- Francis Arthur Sutton, and English adventurer
- David Thompson, (1770–1857), early Canadian explorer
- John Sen Inches Thomson, (1845–1933), Scottish whaler and sealer, ship owner, captain and author
- Brigadier General Sydney Frederick Williams, Royal Engineers

=== Queen Victoria's Visits ===
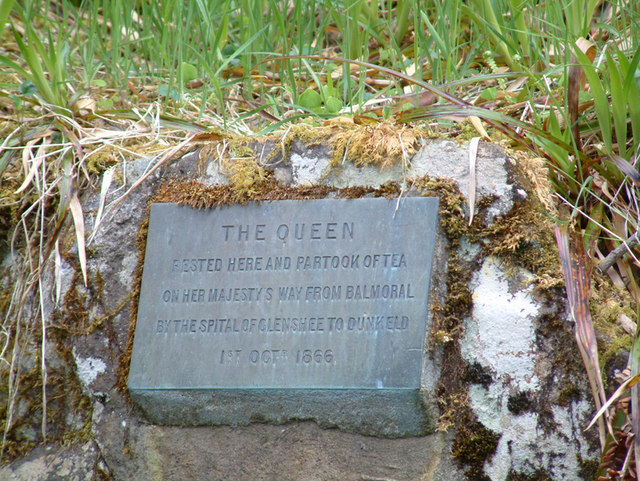
Queen Victoria Plaque Between Dirnanean and Kindrogan

Queen Victoria passed through the lands of Dirnanean in 1865 and again in 1866, on her way from Balmoral Castle to Dunkeld via the Spittal of Glenshee. The visit in 1865 included a brief stop at Dirnanean House before a more extended visit at Kindrogan House. A plaque set into the hillside between Dirnanean and Kindrogan marks the spot where the travellers had tea on the 1866 visit.

Today, Dirnanean House provides hikers on the Cateran Trail with a hut for lunch or shelter very near the spot where Queen Victoria stopped for a picnic.

=== Historic description of the estate ===
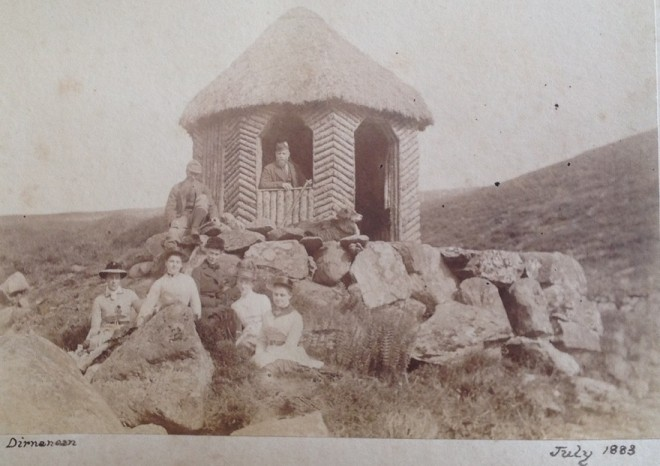
James Small in the Dirnanean Summer House

An 1880 description of the Dirnanean estate described it as follows:

The byres and stables are kept remarkably tidy being paragons of cleanliness in their way: while the dairy etc., are a perfect treat. The various kinds of stock grace their habitation. The accommodation of the farm servants is really comfortable. The policy grounds are very tastefully laid out, and the avenue is one of the nicest to be seen. A fine burn runs along the east side of the steading, the mansion and the avenue and joins the Ardle at the hamlet of Enochdhu. The burn flows through a deep den, which is prettily laid out with walks and rockeries and constructed with 'creature stones'. Here, also, is a nice heather or summer house perched on a precipice, overhanging a still pool and from which a charming view is obtained of two small cascades. The approach is also very lovely. Ardle's grave is situated here.

=== The Perthshire Eagle ===
Eagle's Cage Postcard

For 37 years, until its death in 1908, an eagle was kept in captivity in a metal and thatched cage next to the Dirnanean Burn. Taken when young from its nest near the Kirkton of Glenisla, the eagle was fed mainly on game by the estate staff.

The Perthshire Eagle was a popular Perthshire attraction during its residence at Dirnanean. Several postcards depicting the eagle in its cage next the Dirnanean Burn were issued to draw Victorian travellers to the Dirnanean area.

Partial remnants of the eagle's cage can still be seen along the Dirnanean Burn walk.

== Features ==
=== Dirnanean Garden ===
The estate's traditional highland garden area includes 1.5 hectares of garden plantings with 7 hectares of policies located 1,000 feet above sea level.

Features within the garden include a refurbished summer house on the front lawn, a walled garden, a burn walk with cascades, a traditional estate kitchen garden with an orchard, a greenhouse and potager (kitchen garden), and a small museum of garden tools discovered during the refurbishment of the garden and the grounds. The summer house sits on a turntable that allows the entire structure to be pivoted to face the sunlight as it moves across the lawn.

Peacocks and guineafowls can often be seen roaming the grounds, and a Wellingtonia (Sequoiadendron giganteum) specimen tree bordering the front lawn is estimated to have been planted around 1870.

The garden is accessible by the public for a small fee.

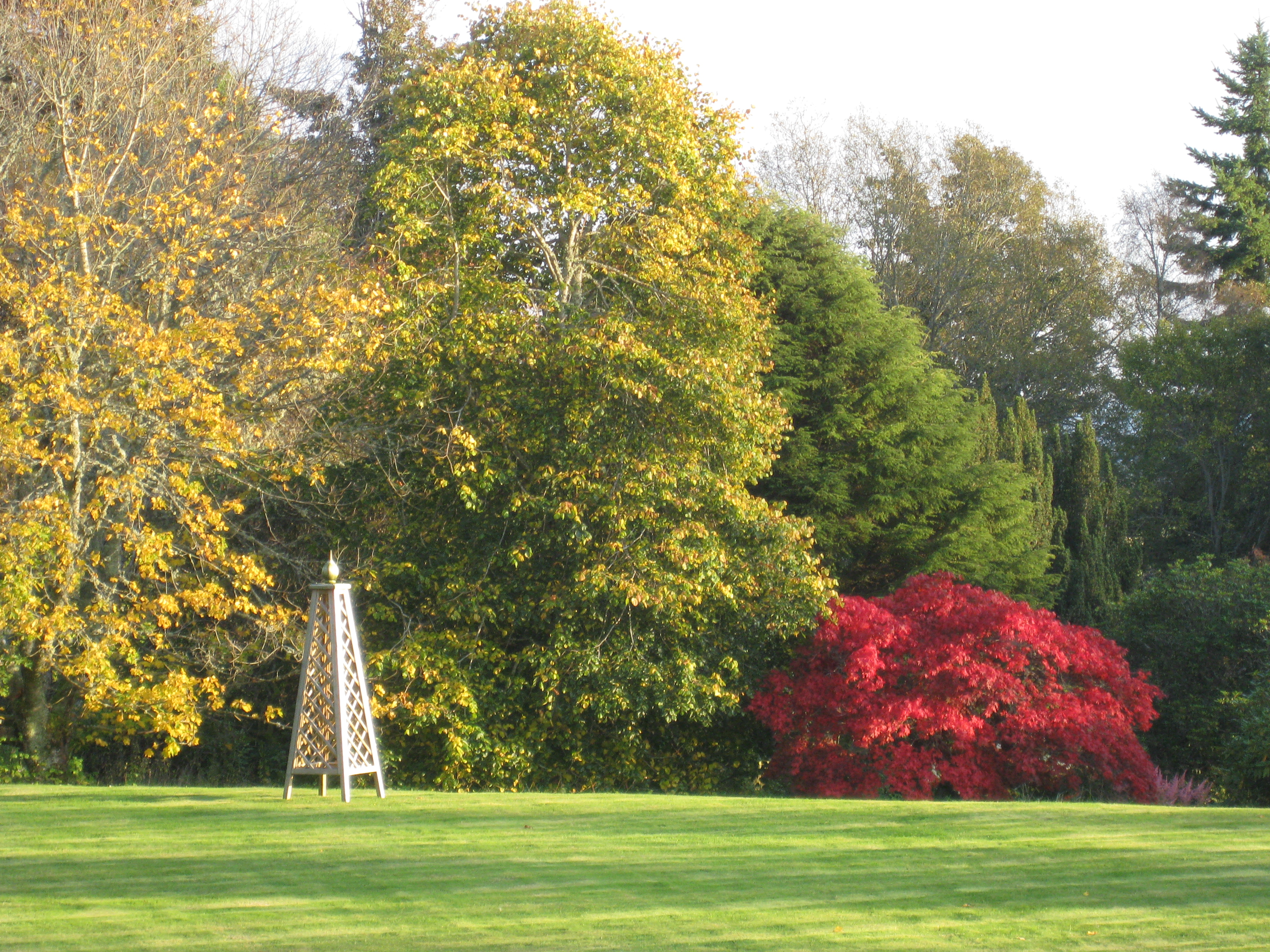
Front lawn

Garden museum

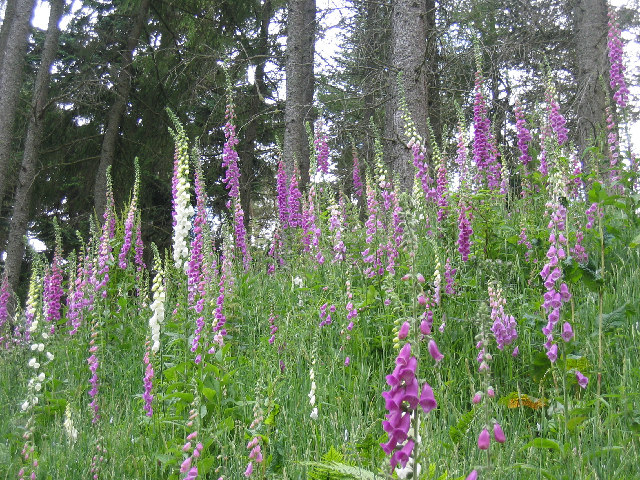
Wild foxgloves

Fowl house and barns

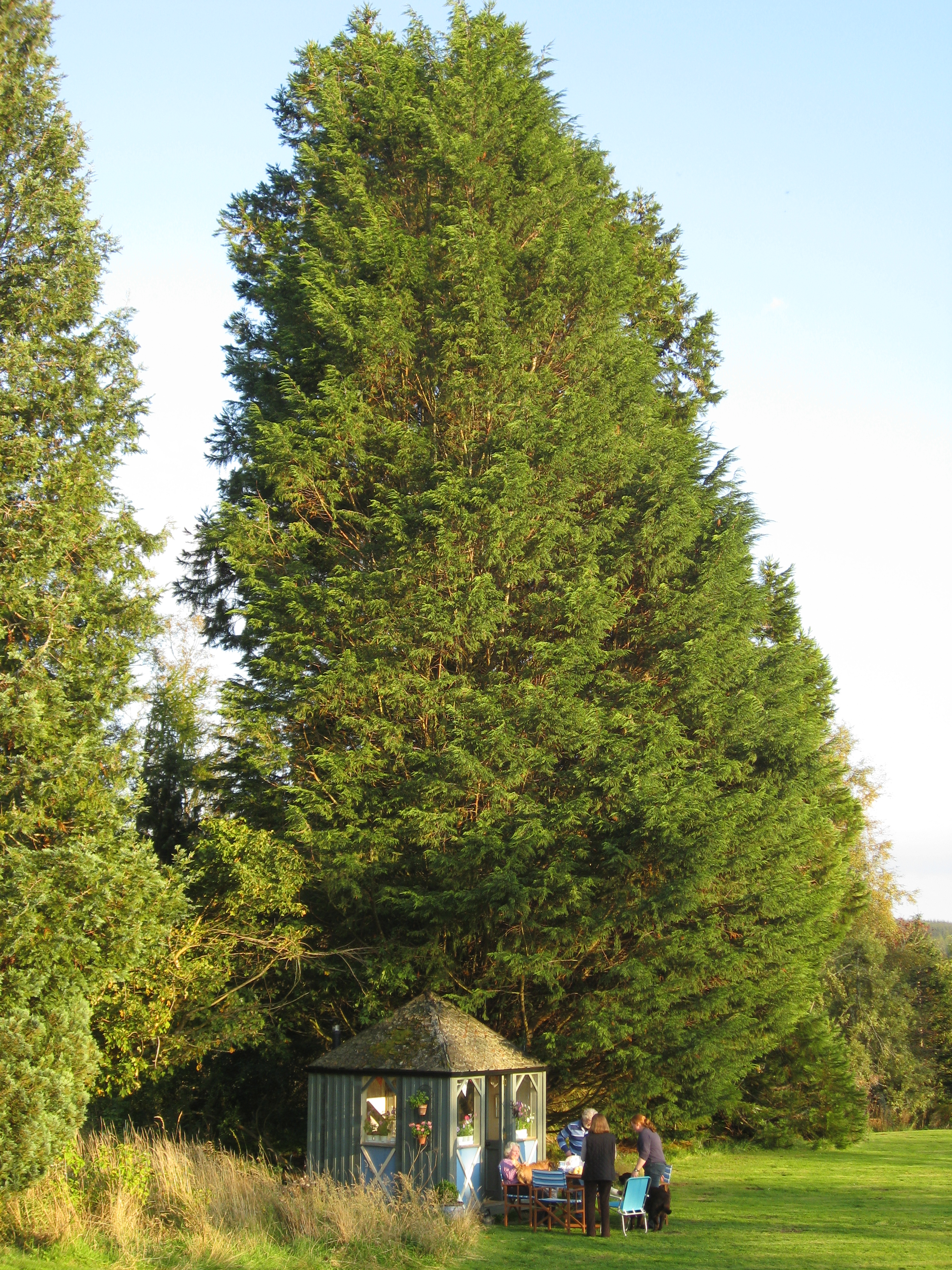
Wellingtonia specimen tree behind refurbished summer house

=== Dirnanean Burn ===
One of the finest features of the estate is the Allt Doire-nan-Eun (Scottish Gaelic for "stream of the thicket of the fowl"), a stream flowing from high in the Dirnanean hills southwards through a deep wooded gorge on its way to the River Ardle. The burn includes several cascades, a small island and a walking trail that runs parallel to it as it winds through the estate.

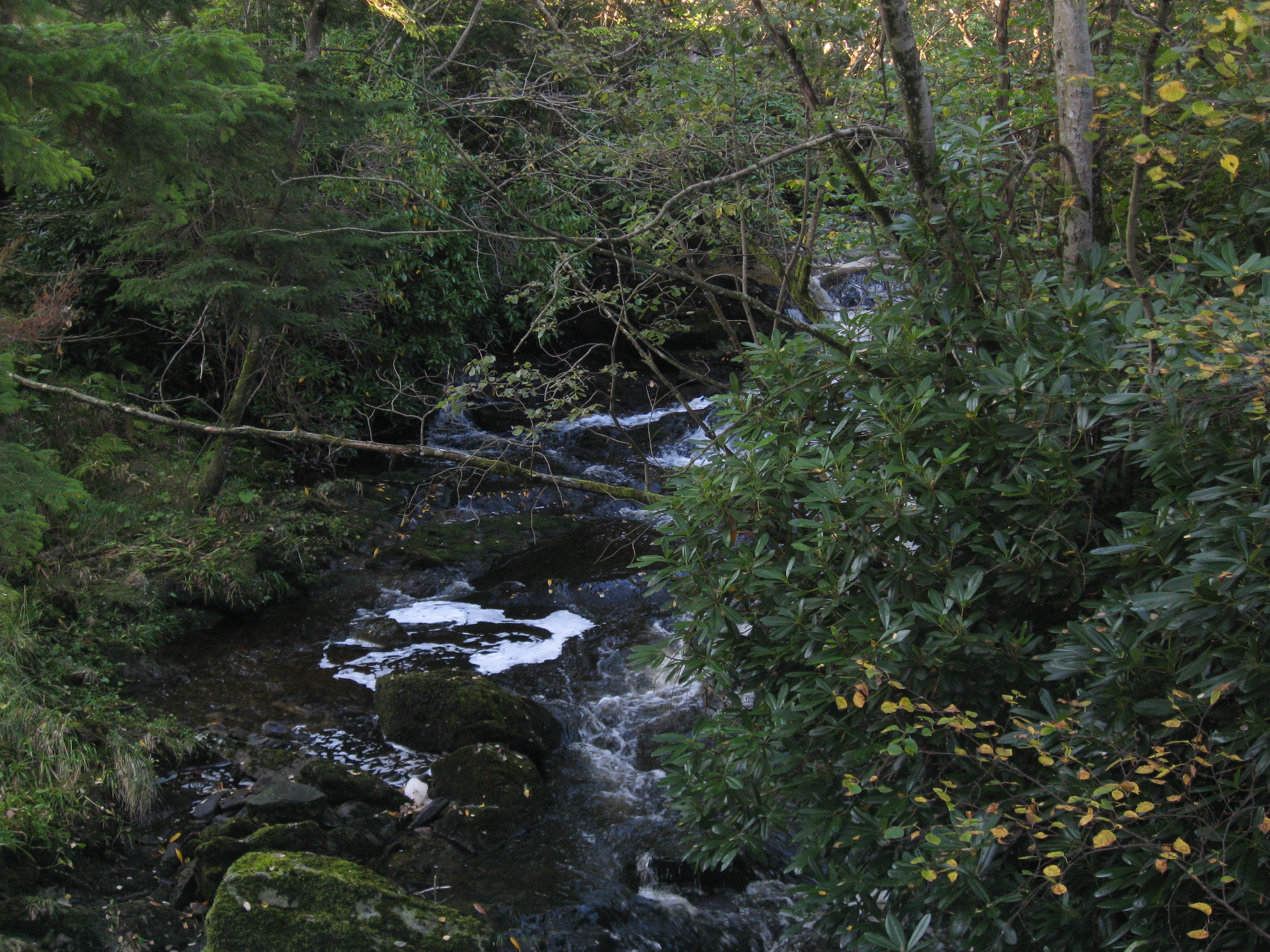
Estate stream

Burn cascades

Folly & creature stone on burn walk

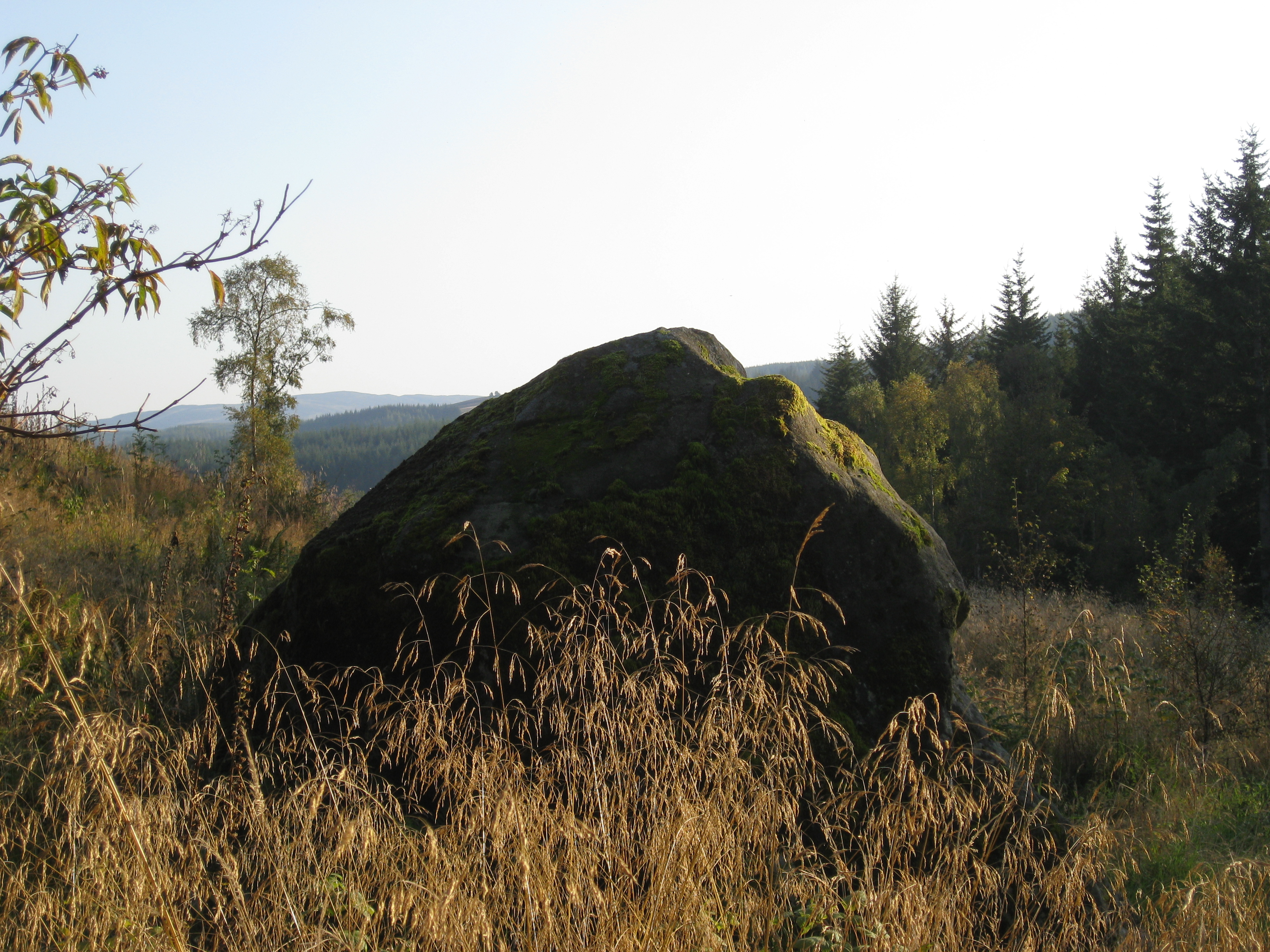
Field boulder

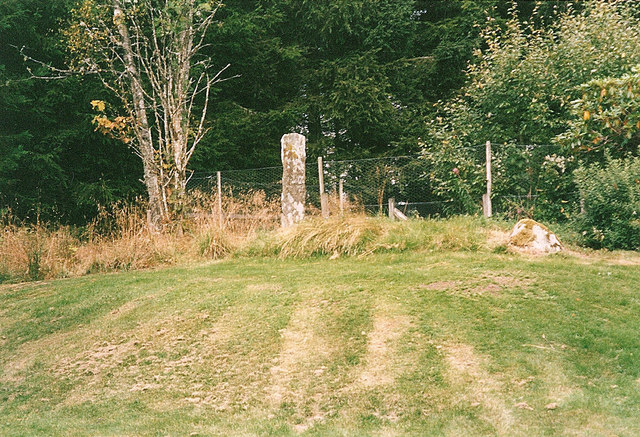
Ardle's Grave

=== Ardle's Grave ===
Near the former carriage entrance of Dirnanean House, close to the hamlet of Enochdhu, lies the grave of a Pictish warrior named Ard-fhuil – reportedly a giant – who gave his name to the surrounding area of Strathardle. Nothing remains to suggest a larger structure; the standing stone might have once carried an inscription, but this has since weathered away. Local lore has it that during Victorian times, the laird of Dirnanean buried his horse at the spot as a garden amusement.
