= Andrew Munro (mathematician) =

Andrew Munro, M.A., (6 July 1869 – 1 July 1935) was a Scottish lecturer in mathematics, Vice President, Bursar, Steward and Senior Fellow of Queens' College, Cambridge for 45 years from 1893 to 1935. The Munro scholarships and studentships at Queens' College, Cambridge are named in his honour.

== Early life ==
Andrew Munro was born 6 July 1869, in Rosskeen, Ross and Cromarty, Scotland, the son of Andrew Munro and Margaret Small of Invergordon in Ross and Cromarty. His father was a banker, mill owner and farmer, who also served as Chief Magistrate for Invergordon and Justice of the Peace for Ross and Cromarty. The Munros were members of the Clan Munro. His mother was the daughter of John Small (1797–1847), under Librarian of the University of Edinburgh, and the sister of John Small (1828–1886), who succeeded his father as under Librarian and later was appointed Librarian. Munro's mother and family were members of the Smalls of Dirnanean, Perthshire, Scotland.

== Academics ==
Munro initially attended Aberdeen University, Scotland, later transferring to Cambridge. He won a foundation scholarship to Queens' College, Cambridge in 1890, and two years later was designated as the fourth Wrangler.

In 1892, Munro received his Bachelor of Arts degree, followed by a Masters of Arts degree in 1896. In 1893, he was elected a Fellow at Queens' College, Cambridge. For the next 20 years he served as a lecturer, director of studies, and supervisor in mathematics at the college.

In 1913, Munro became Bursar of Queens' College, Cambridge. In this role, Munro advised the college to dispose of most of its farmland after World War I and invest in government stocks, which significantly increased the college's endowments.

== Legacy ==
Andrew Munro died on 1 July 1935 at Dormy House Hotel in Sheringham, Norfolk, England. He was buried in St. Giles Cemetery in Cambridge, now referred to as Parish of the Ascension Burial Ground, on 4 July 1935.

A portion of Munro's estate, upwards of £26,000, was left to Queens' College, Cambridge to fund scholarships in mathematics and physics. These scholarships and studentships are named in Munro's honour.

The Munro Room at Queens' College, Cambridge which faces both Old Court and Walnut Tree Court, is named for Munro. A portrait of Munro, painted by Arthur Trevor Haddon, appropriately hangs in the room.
