= John Small (British Army medical officer) =

British Army officer and physician

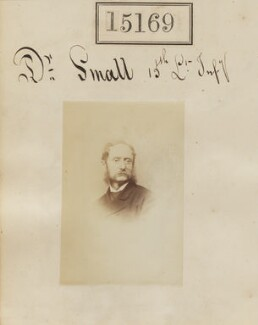
- John Small, Staff Surgeon, 15th Light Infantry, 1823-1879, National Portrait Gallery, London
- Born: January 28, 1823; Edinburgh, Scotland
- Died: 1879 (aged 55–56); Woolwich, England
- Education: University of Edinburgh
- Occupation: Army physician
- Known for: Early advocate for the use of large doses of quinine to treat malaria
- Relatives: Patrick Small and Mary Brown Small
- Medical career
- Institutions: British Army

Deputy Surgeon-General John Small (28 January 1823 – July 1879) was a British Army officer, physician, and early advocate for the use of large doses of quinine to treat malaria.

== Early life ==
Small was born in Edinburgh, Scotland, the oldest son of Patrick Small and Mary Brown Small. His father was a silversmith, jeweller and auctioneer on Edinburgh's Advocate's Close. Small and his family were members of the Smalls of Dirnanean.

== Career ==
Small began his medical career as an apprentice under J. F. MacFarlan in the North Bridge section of Edinburgh. He later attended the University of Edinburgh and the extra-academical school. He received his medical licence from the Royal College of Surgeons of Edinburgh in 1843. After two years in private practice he entered the army in 1845. His first assignment was with the 12th Regiment of Foot at Mauritius. He was later reassigned to Africa to fight in the Cape Frontier Wars, for which he received a medal. He afterwards served as surgeon for the Cape Mounted Riflemen before returning to Mauritius as staff surgeon. He was promoted to surgeon-major on 30 December 1865. In 1867 Small co-authored the Report on the Malarial Epidemic Fever of Mauritius of 1866–67, in which large doses of quinine were advocated to treat malaria fever. Small was promoted to deputy surgeon-general in 1875 and placed in charge of medical services in the Woolwich district in London.

== Death ==
Small died at Woolwich in July 1879. He was survived by his widow and one daughter.
