= James Wallis =

James Wallis may refer to:

== Politicians ==
- James Wallis (New Zealand politician) (1825–1912), New Zealand politician
- James Wallis (English politician), MP

== Others ==
- James Wallis (British Army officer) (1785–1858), major of the 46th Regiment, commandant of Newcastle convict settlement
- James Wallis (games designer), British writer, games designer and publisher
- James Wallis (racing driver) (born 2005), British racing driver
- Jim Wallis (born 1948), Christian writer and activist
- Jimmy Wallis (born 1974), English field hockey player
- James H. Wallis (1861–1940), Latter Day Saint hymnwriter, editor and Patriarch
- James Wallis (1809–1895), pioneer Wesleyan Missionary New Zealand

== See also ==
- James Wallace (disambiguation)
- Jamie Wallis (born 1984), British politician
