= Alfred Crowfoot =

Alfred Henchman Crowfoot (14 September 1881 – 21 November 1962) was Dean of Quebec from 1927 to 1947.

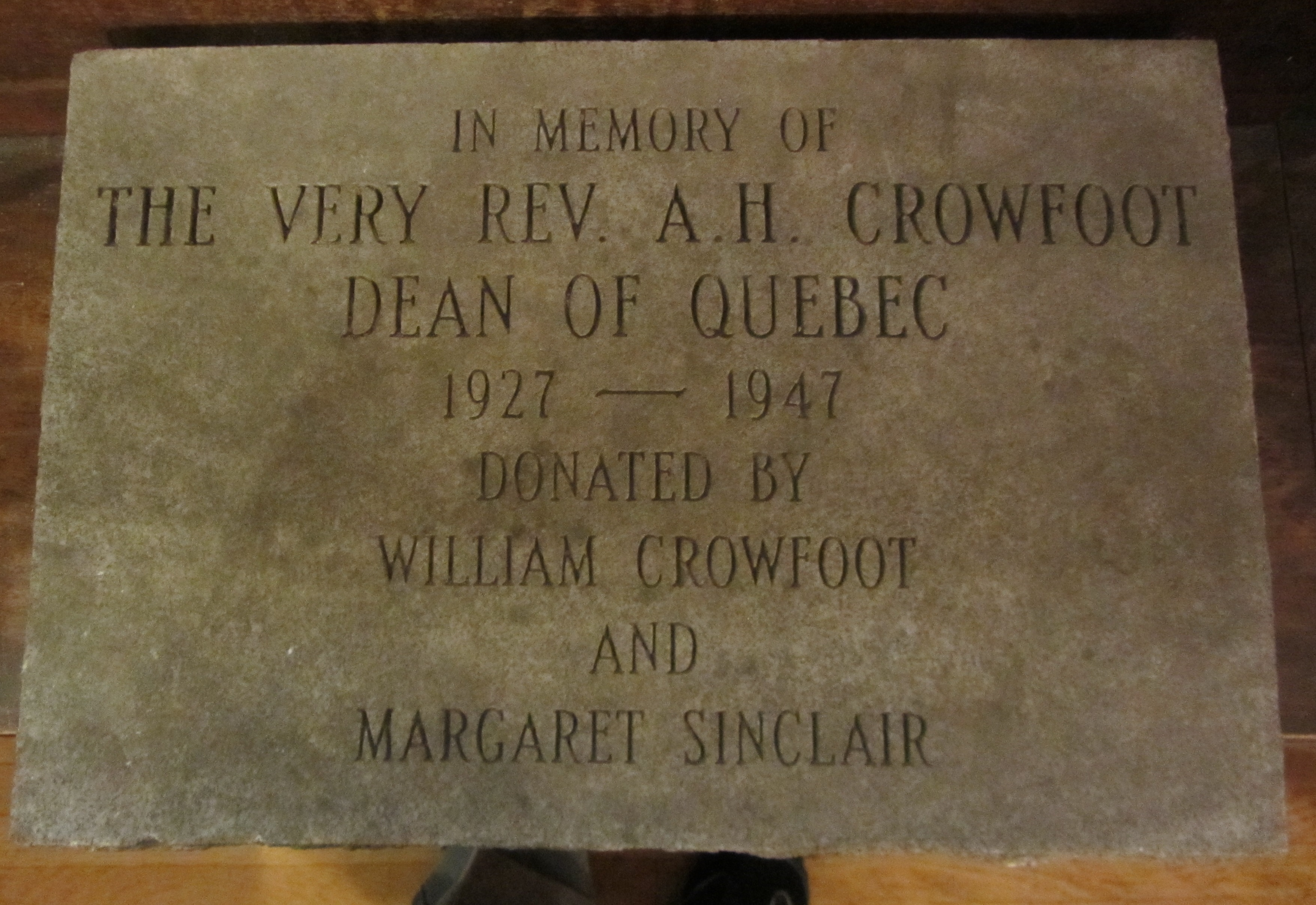
The Very Reverend A. H. Crowfoot Memorial Stone

== Life ==
Crowfoot was born in Beccles on 14 September 1881, the son of William Miller Crowfoot MB, FRCS and Catherine Anne Bayly. He was educated at Emmanuel College, Cambridge. He was ordained after a period of study at Wells Theological College in 1905. After a curacy in Wigan he held three incumbencies in New Brunswick: at Grand Falls, Hampton and Saint John. He was Archdeacon of Saint John from 1916 to 1927.

A scholarly man, in 1947 Crowfoot wrote a guide to the Quebec cathedral, entitled The Cathedral of the Holy Trinity, Quebec: A Perambulation. In 1957, a biography Crowfoot wrote, entitled Benjamin Cronyn: First Bishop of Huron, was published by The Incorporated Synod of the Diocese of Huron.

Alfred Crowfoot died on 21 November 1962.

== Family ==
Crowfoot married Margaret Jessie Walker, the daughter of the Rev. Millidge P. Walker and his wife, Jessie Inches, on 30 June 1914. Through her mother, Margaret was a member of the Smalls of Dirnanean. The couple had a son and a daughter.

Crowfoot was a first cousin to John Winter Crowfoot CBE.
