= James Wallace (footballer, fl. 1928–1931) =

Scottish footballer

Personal information
- Full name: James Wallace
- Place of birth: Milton of Campsie, Scotland
- Position: Inside forward

Senior career*
Years	Team	Apps	(Gls)
- Clyde
1928–1930	Burnley	39	(8)
1930–1931	Chester		
1931	Hibernian	12	(0)
- * Club domestic league appearances and goals

James Wallace was a Scottish professional footballer who played as an inside forward. He played in the English Football League for Burnley and in the Scottish League for Hibernian.
