= James Wallace (minister) =

James Wallace (1642–1688) was a Scottish minister in Orkney and topographical writer.

== Life ==
He studied at the University of Aberdeen, where he graduated M.A. on 27 April 1659. He was shortly afterwards appointed minister of Ladykirk in Orkney. From there he was translated to Kirkwall in 1672. On 16 October 1678 he was also collated by Bishop Mackenzie to the prebend of St. John in St Magnus Cathedral.

Wallace died of fever in September 1688.

== Works ==
Wallace is known for his work A Description of the Isles of Orkney (1693), dedicated to Sir Robert Sibbald. Wallace had originally undertaken his ‘Description’ at the request of Sibbald, who was planning a general atlas of Scotland. ‘An Account from Orkney,’ by James Wallace, was sent to Sibbald, who was collecting statistical information regarding the counties of Scotland.

In 1700 Wallace's botanist son James published under his own name ‘An Account of the Islands of Orkney,’ (London, Jacob Tonson). This work, which makes no mention of his father's works, consists of the ‘Description’ of 1693, with some omissions and additions, but including a chapter on the plants and shells of Orkney. The younger Wallace substituted a dedication from himself to Charles Sackville, 6th Earl of Dorset.

The original work, with illustrative notes, edited by John Small, was reprinted at Edinburgh in 1883. Wallace left in manuscript, besides sermons and miscellaneous pieces, “A Harmony of the Evangelists,” “Commonplaces,” a treatise of the ancient and modern church discipline, and anti-Catholic writings.

== Family ==
He married Elizabeth Cuthbert, and had three sons, James, Andrew, Alexander, and a daughter Jean.

== Notes ==
Attribution

This article incorporates text from a publication now in the public domain: "Wallace, James (d.1688)". Dictionary of National Biography. London: Smith, Elder & Co. 1885–1900.
