= Brewlands Bridge =

Hamlet in Angus, Scotland

Coordinates: 56.738171°N 3.317544°W

- Location within Angus
- OS grid reference: NO195615
- Council area: Angus
- Lieutenancy area: Angus
- Country: Scotland
- Sovereign state: United Kingdom
- Post town: BLAIRGOWRIE
- Postcode district: PH11
- Dialling code: 01575
- Police: Scotland
- Fire: Scottish
- Ambulance: Scottish
- UK Parliament: Angus
- Scottish Parliament: North Tayside; North East Scotland

Brewlands Bridge is a hamlet in Glen Isla, Angus, Scotland. It is lies situated on the River Isla, eleven miles north-west of Kirriemuir and ten miles north of Blairgowrie, on the B951 road.

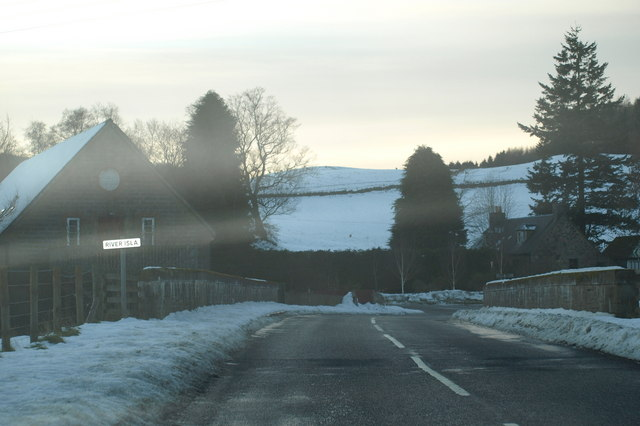
Brewlands Bridge

The original single segmented arch bridge, dating to the early 19th century remains, although it has been bypassed by a modern replacement.
