= Jimmy Wallace =

English footballer and manager

Personal information
- Full name: James Wallace
- Date of birth: 13 December 1937
- Place of birth: Birkenhead, England
- Date of death: 22 March 2007 (aged 69)
- Place of death: Stoke-on-Trent
- Position: Left winger

Senior career*
Years	Team	Apps	(Gls)
1955–1960	Stoke City	8	(1)
1960–1962	Northwich Victoria		
1962–1963	Doncaster Rovers	14	(1)
1963–1966	Stafford Rangers		
Total		22	(2)

Managerial career
- 1980-1981: Nantwich Town
- 1981–1984: Leek Town
- 1997-2000: Kidsgrove Athletic
- 2000–2004: Newcastle Town
- * Club domestic league appearances and goals

James Wallace (13 December 1937 – 22 March 2007) was an English footballer who played in the Football League for Doncaster Rovers and Stoke City.

== Career ==
Wallace was born in Birkenhead and joined Stoke City's youth team in the 1950s. He made six appearances for Stoke during the 1958–59 season and made two more in the following season where he scored against Sheffield United in April 1960. Because of an injury in training with new manager Tony Waddington Wallace became surplus to requirements and so was released. He joined Northwich Victoria before enjoying a brief spell back in league football with Doncaster Rovers before returning to non-league with Stafford Rangers.

Jimmy went on to have a successful career in non-league management. After serving as Manager at Ball Haye Green and Eastwood (Hanley), he was appointed Manager of Nantwich Town in the summer of 1980. He led the Dabbers to their one and only Cheshire County League title in 1981 before taking over at Leek Town in November 1981. He returned to Eastwood (Hanley) before managing Kidsgrove Athletic and Newcastle Town.

== Career statistics ==
Appearances and goals by club, season and competition
Club	Season	League			FA Cup		Total	
Club	Season	Division	Apps	Goals	Apps	Goals	Apps	Goals
Stoke City	1958–59	Second Division	6	0	0	0	6	0
Stoke City	1959–60	Second Division	2	1	0	0	2	1
Doncaster Rovers	1962–63	Fourth Division	14	1	0	0	14	1
Career total			22	2	0	0	22	2
