= James Wallace (mathematician) =

- Born: Ireland
- Died: 1850
- Known for: A New Treatise on the Use of the Globes
- Scientific career
- Fields: Mathematics, Astronomy
- Institutions: Georgetown College, South Carolina College

James Wallace (died 1850) was an Irish-born American mathematician and Catholic priest. After emigrating to the United States, he taught mathematics in New York City, at Georgetown College in D.C., and finally at South Carolina College in Columbia. Whilst in New York he published A New Treatise on the Use of the Globes, and Practical Astronomy; or a Comprehensive View of the System of the World. He was an occasional correspondent of Thomas Jefferson.
