= James Wallace (botanist) =

Scottish physician and botanist

James Wallace (fl. 1684–1724) was a Scottish physician and botanist.

== Life ==
He was the eldest son of James Wallace, a minister in Orkney. He qualified M.D., and took part in the Darien scheme. He passed some plants from what is now Panama to James Petiver, and Hans Sloane. He became Fellow of the Royal Society, and had some employment with the East India Company. His later life is obscure.

== Works ==
He edited his father's Description of the Isles of Orkney in 1693 and 1700. The first edition was dedicated to Robert Sibbald; the second, which added information on plants and shells of Orkney, was dedicated to Charles Sackville, 6th Earl of Dorset and made no mention of his father's contribution. In 1700 he contributed to the Philosophical Transactions of the Royal Society ‘A Part of a Journal kept from Scotland to New Caledonia in Darien, with a short Account of that Country’.

Wallace was also the author of a ‘History of Scotland from Fergus I to the Commencement of the Union,’ Dublin, 1724.
