= Jim Wallace (footballer) =

Scottish footballer

Personal information
- Full name: James Wallace
- Date of birth: 9 June 1954 (age 72)
- Place of birth: Stirling, Scotland
- Position: Left back

Senior career*
Years	Team	Apps	(Gls)
1972–1975	Dunfermline Athletic	73	(3)
1975–1977	Aldershot	56	(0)
1977–1979	Alloa Athletic	52	(3)
Total		181	(6)

International career
1974	Scottish League XI	1	(0)
- * Club domestic league appearances and goals

Jim Wallace (born 9 June 1954) is a Scottish former professional footballer who played as a left back.

== Career ==
Born in Stirling, Wallace played for Dunfermline Athletic, Aldershot and Alloa Athletic.
