= Kindrogan House =

Building in Perth and Kinross, Scotland

Coordinates: 56°44′55″N 3°32′47″W

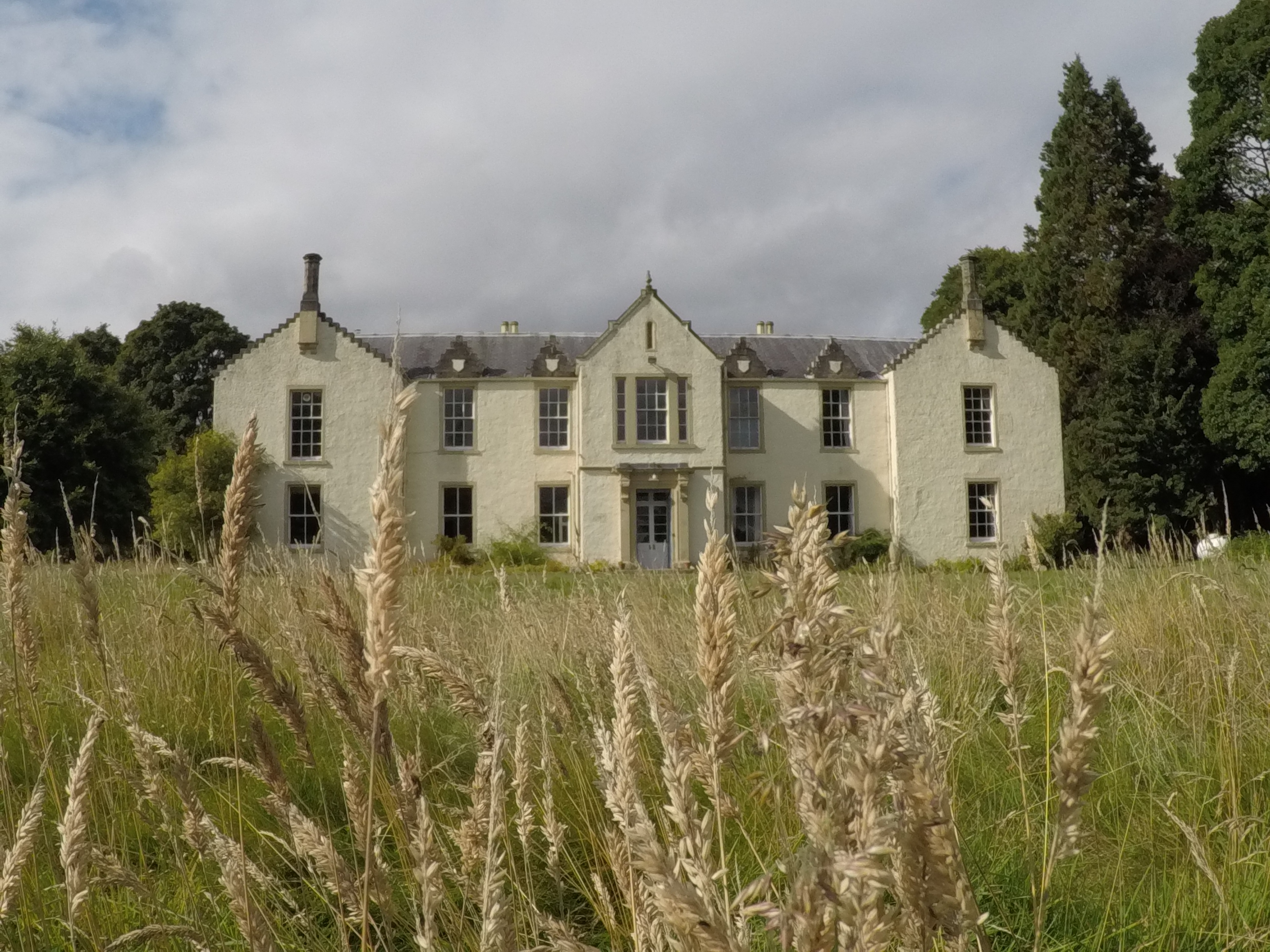
Kindrogan House

Kindrogan House is located near Enochdhu, Blairgowrie, Perth and Kinross in Moulin parish, at the head of Strath Ardle, 7 miles (11 km) ENE of Pitlochry and 2 1/2 miles (4.0 km) northwest of Kirkmichael. It is run by Somerville Enterprises CIC, a not-for-profit community interest company.

== Kindrogan House and Somerville Enterprises CIC ==
Kindrogan House is an early 19th-century building, incorporating earlier fabric (possibly mid 18th century), with later additions and alterations. It is a substantial 2-storey structure, with crowstepped gables and a three sided courtyard to the rear. It has an ornate doorpiece, is harled with painted stone margins, and has walls of random rubble with large squared rubble granite quoins.

The centre lies below Kindrogan Hill (485 m) off the A294 Pitlochry to Braemar road and the nearest railway station is at Pitlochry. The Field studies centre was mothballed in 2019 but has reopened as The Chiron Hub, a therapeutic outreach service for children and young people and support for families.

It is also home to the Kindrogan Somerville School, an alternative, democratic, independent School for all children aged 4 – 18 years of age. It offers a Steiner inspired curriculum with nature based learning, and therapeutic care for all students.

The extensive Kindrogan Woods, mostly coniferous, cover the lower slopes of the hill and the River Ardle forms a boundary to the east of the house. An old curling pond lies beside the driveway to the West Lodge.

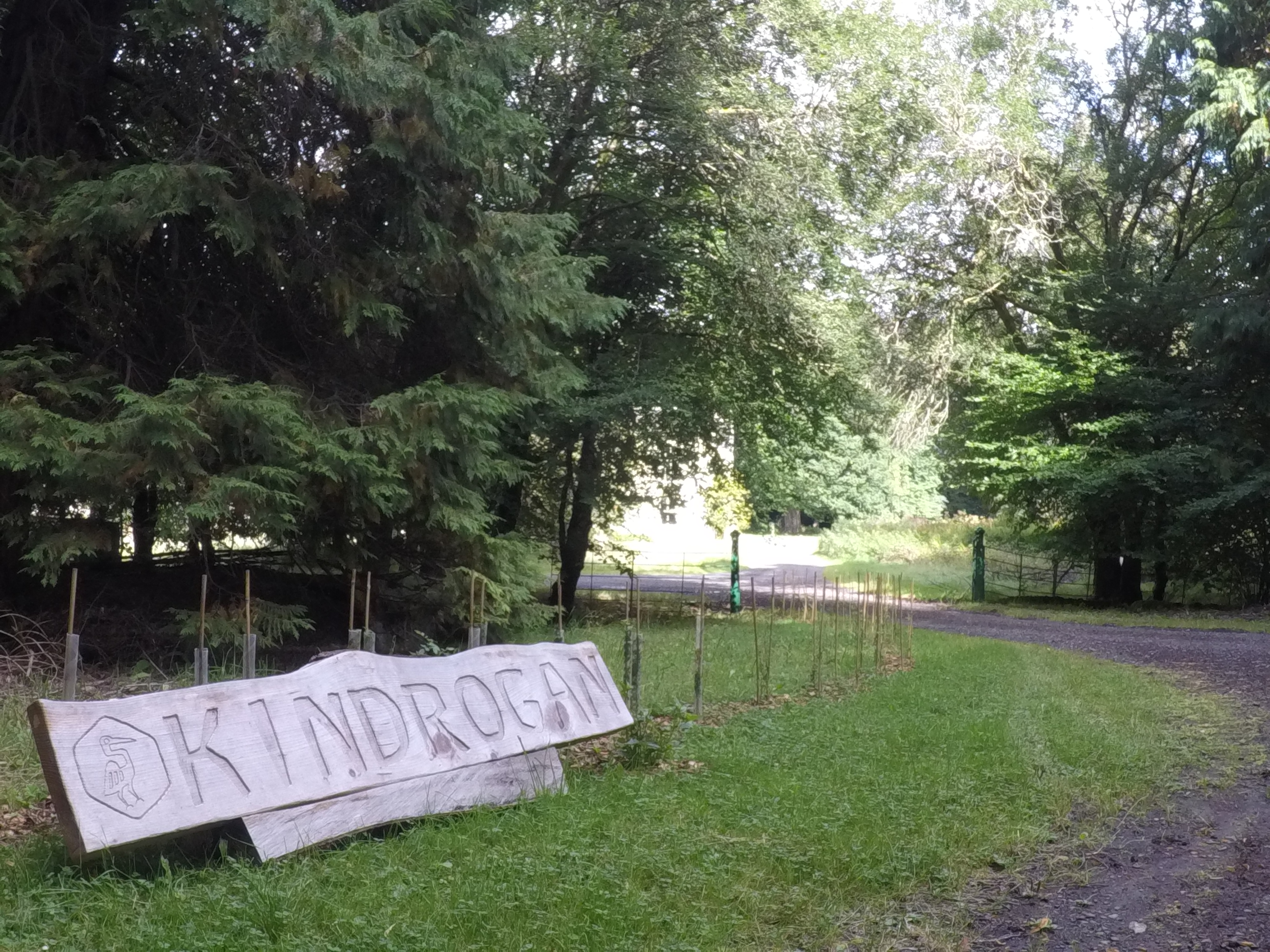
Kindrogan front gate

Dirnanean House, another Highland estate, is nearby.

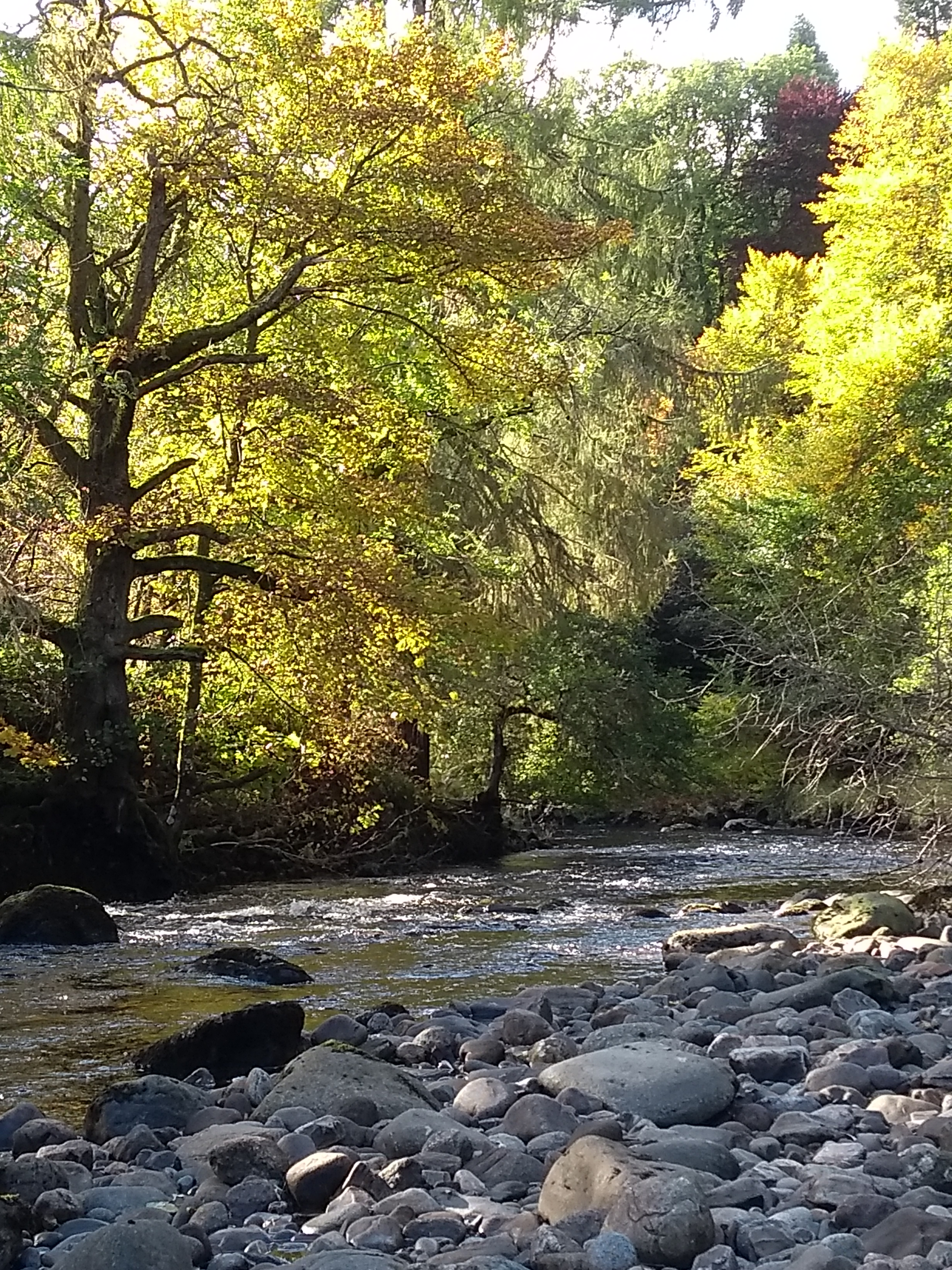
The river Ardle runs along beside Kindrogan House and land

== The Kindrogan Somerville School and surroundings ==
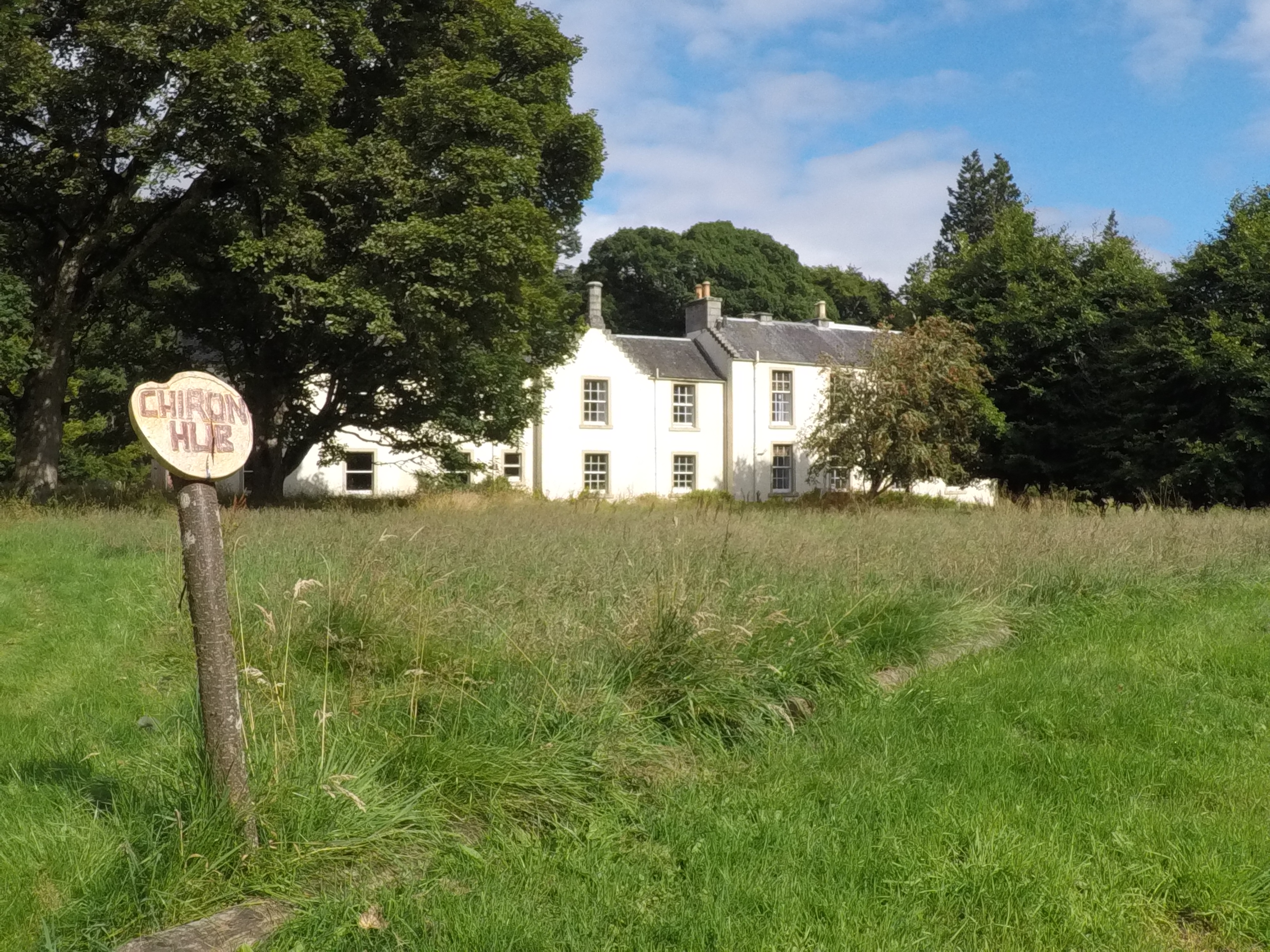
A view of Kindrogan from the car park

=== The Kindrogan Somerville School and Chiron Hub ===
The Kindrogan School is open to all children aged 4 – 6 years in the Kindergarten, 7 – 14 years in the lower school and 14 – 18 years in the upper school.

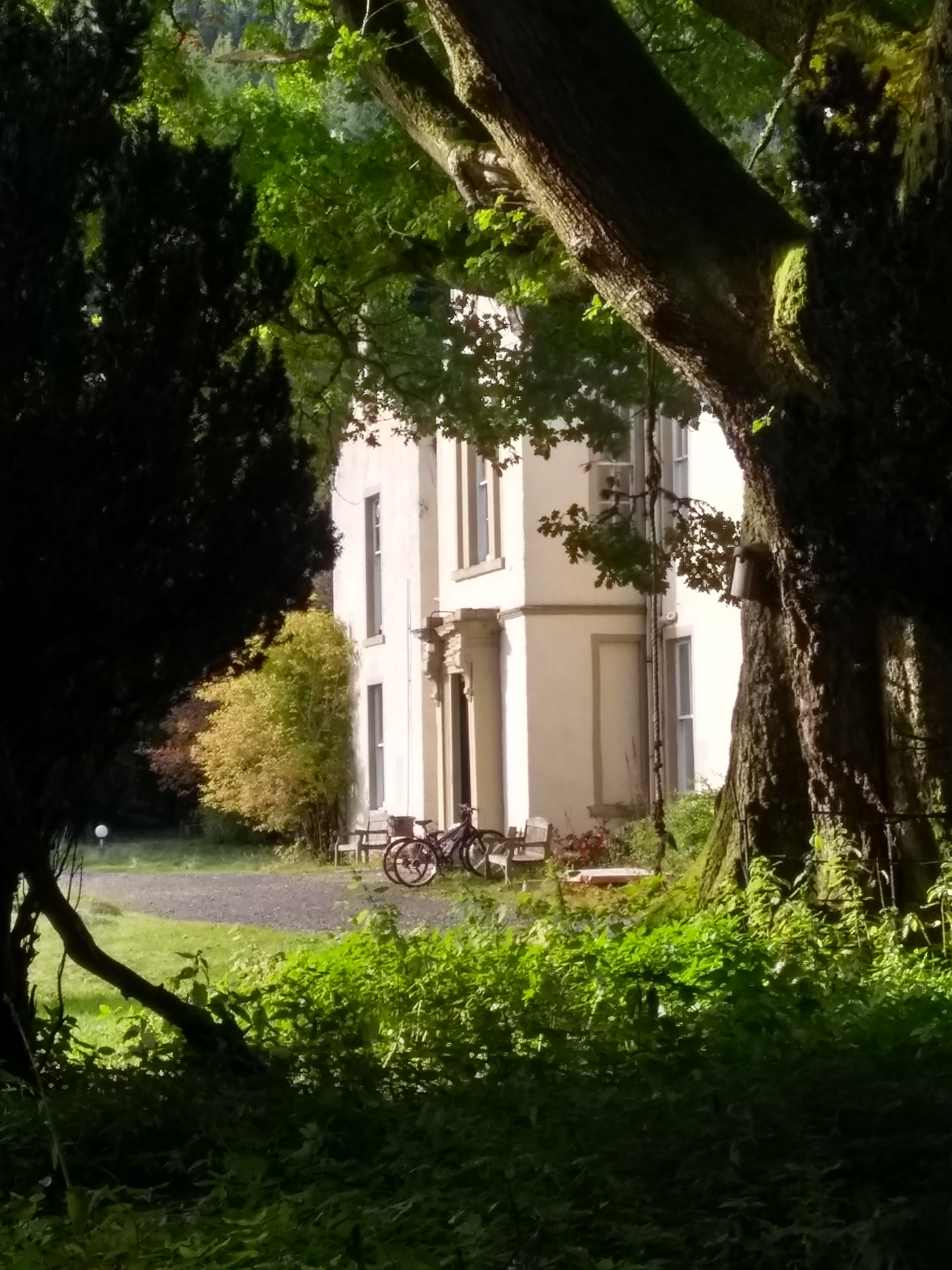
View of Kindrogan front through the trees

== History of the Kindrogan estate ==
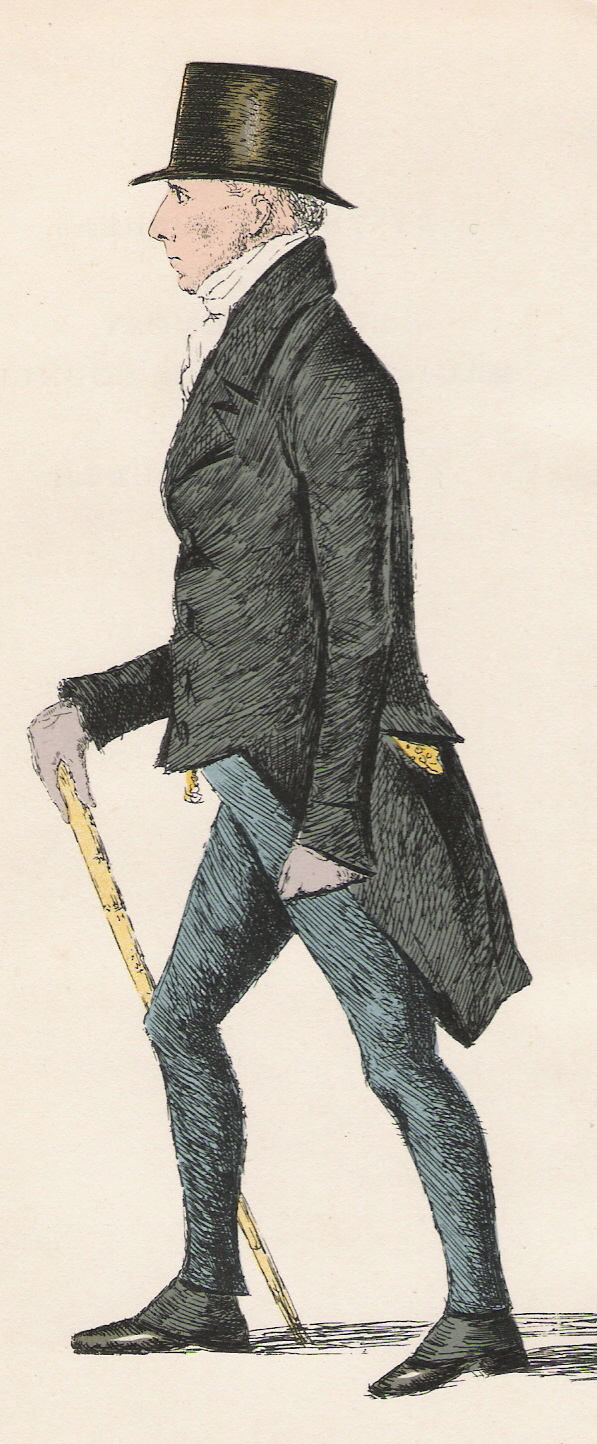
Lord Cockburn

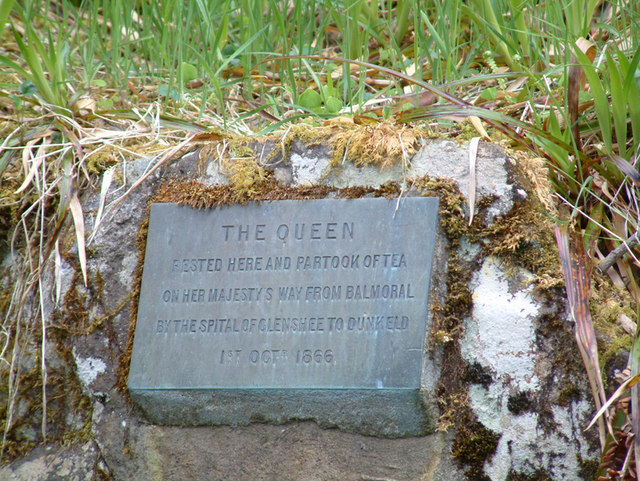
Queen Victoria Plaque Near Kindrogan

Kindrogan Estate was anciently the property of the Robertson and Reid families. Later it was owned by the Small Keir family, passing by marriage from the Small's of Dirnanean and then through the marriage of Jane Amelia Keir to Captain Francis Balfour of Fernie Castle in Fife to the Balfour family. The Balfours purchased Dirnanean in 1926, and upon the marriage of Francis to Katherine Dolby in 1930 they moved residence to that estate, letting Kindrogan to Sir George and Lady Dolby for their summer home. The Balfours returned to Kindrogan after WWII and remained until 1960 when the estate was purchased by the Forestry Commission, and sold on to the current owners, the Scottish Field Studies Association in 1963 after a short spell as a country house hotel. The family or laird's graveyard lies on the slopes of Kindrogan Hill.

A plaque beside the path running from the house to the Enochdhu Lodge beside the River Ardle records that Queen Victoria once stopped here for tea on an excursion from Dunkeld to Spittal of Glenshee.

Another eminent visitor to Kindrogan House was Lord Cockburn, a circuit judge, and frequent guest of the Keirs.

The 1850s 6-inch (150 mm) Ordnance Survey map shows a bowling green to have been situated near the walled garden in the sunken area running down to the River Ardle and a summer houses lay on a path down from the family burial ground.

In the 1880s Patrick Small Keir, Esq. (b. 1810), held the 10,000 acres (40 km^{2}) estate, valued at £2445 per annum.

A number of fine trees and avenues survive from in the old estate policies, including several fine Wellintonias, oaks, limes lining the main drives, yews and specimen sycamores beside the River Ardle. Red squirrels are still common (2009) and the river has many hazels, birches and alders on its banks.

== Features of the old Kindrogan estate ==
=== The family or laird's cemetery ===
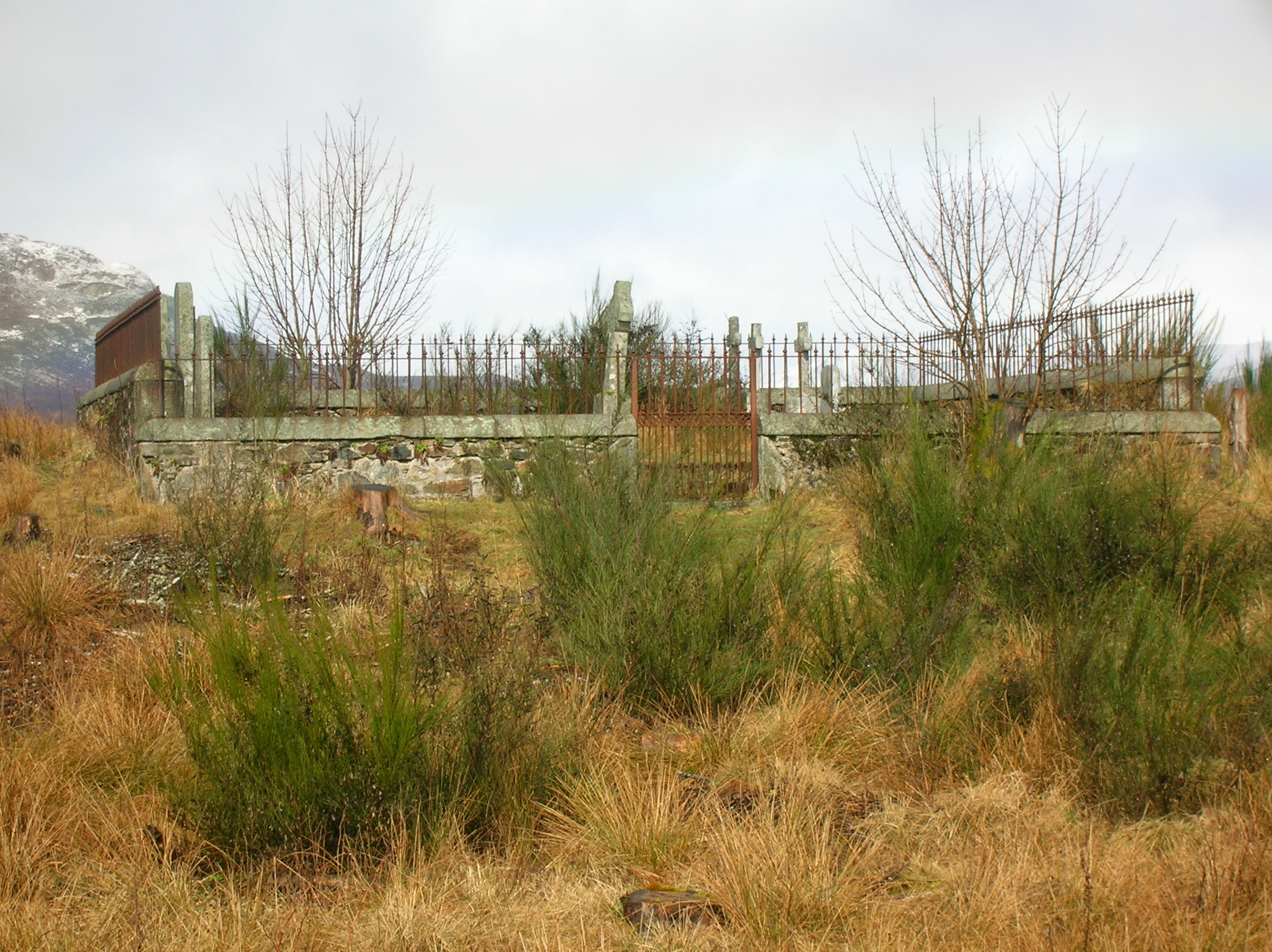
The family or laird's garveyard in 2009

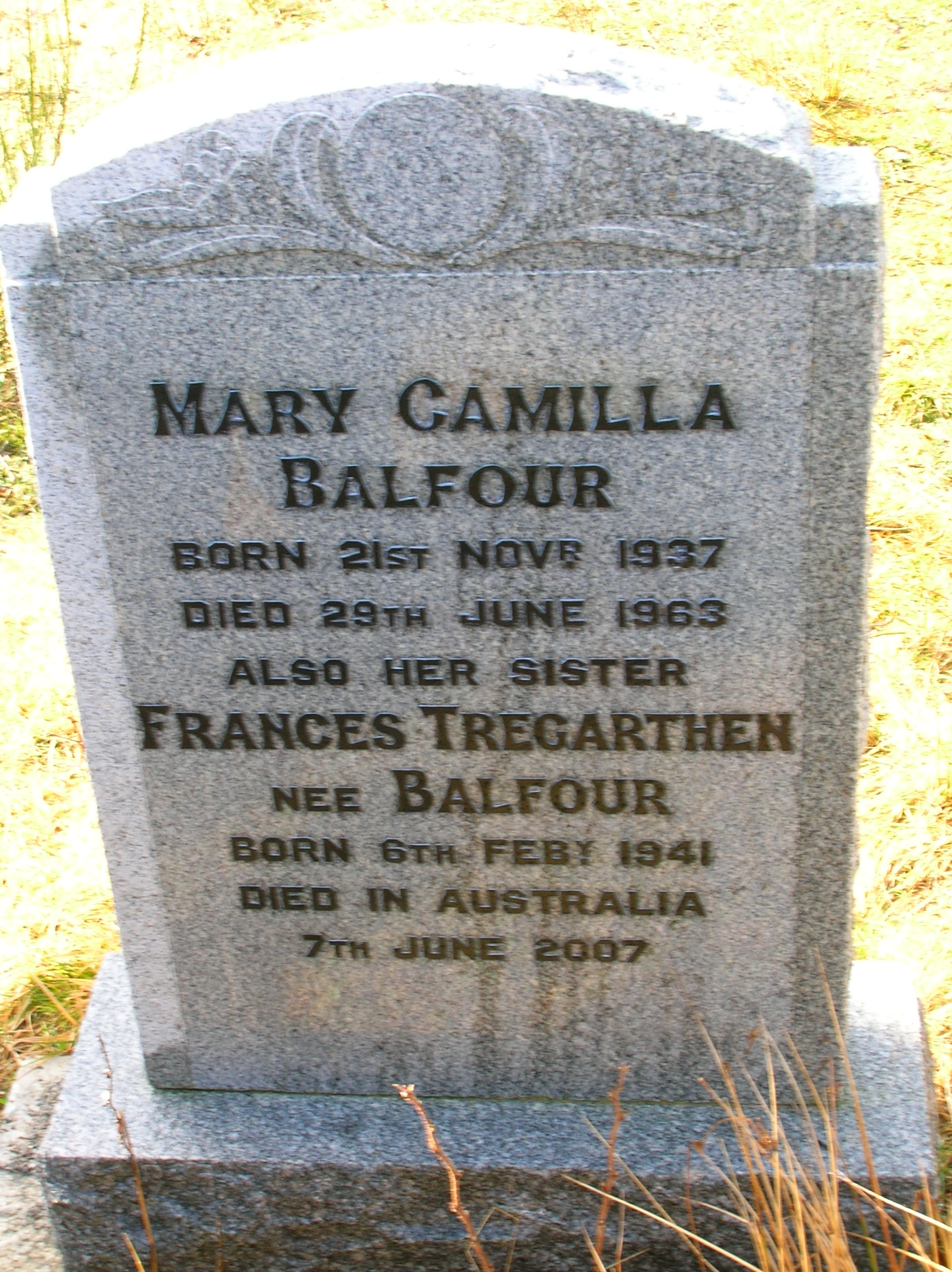
Mary Balfour's gravestone

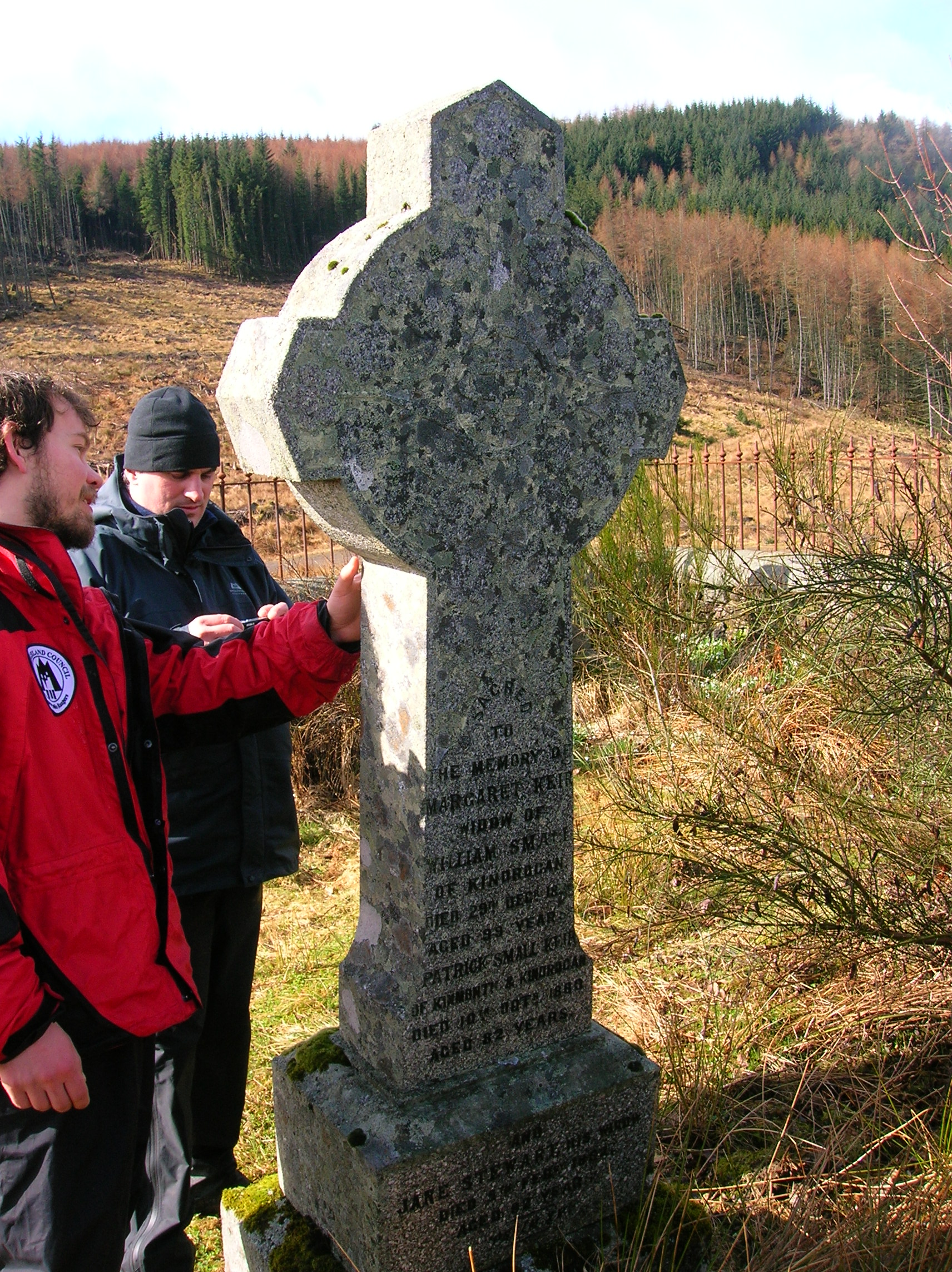
The gravestone of Margaret Keir, widow of William Small being examined for lichens

=== walled garden and associated features ===
The walled garden is a B-listed garden and is now being brought back into productive use as a market garden for the school and for the local community. Significant repairs are underway to restore this walled garden back to its former condition and use by Somerville Enterprises CIC.

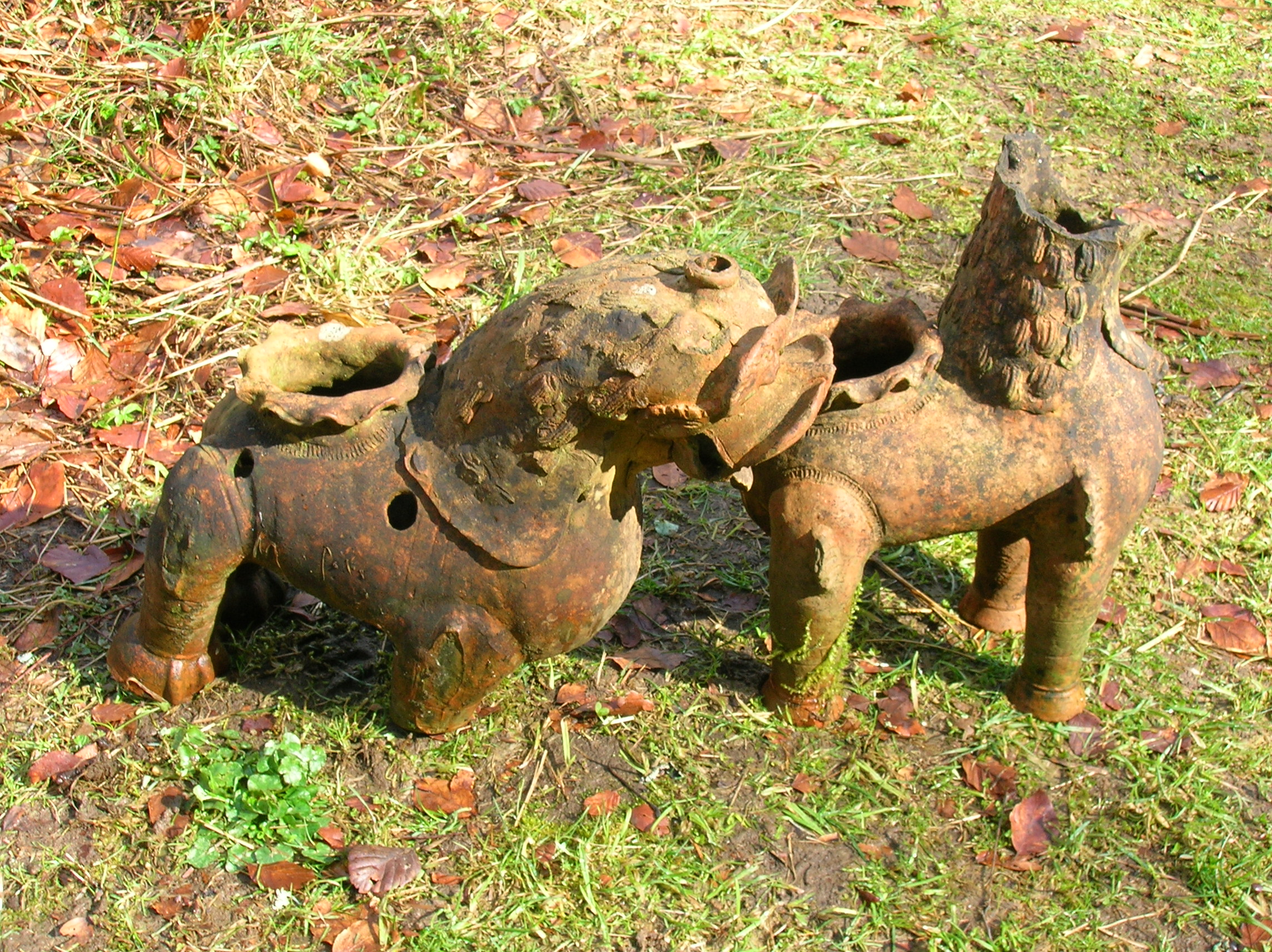
Victorian Dragon Jardinieres outside the walled garden

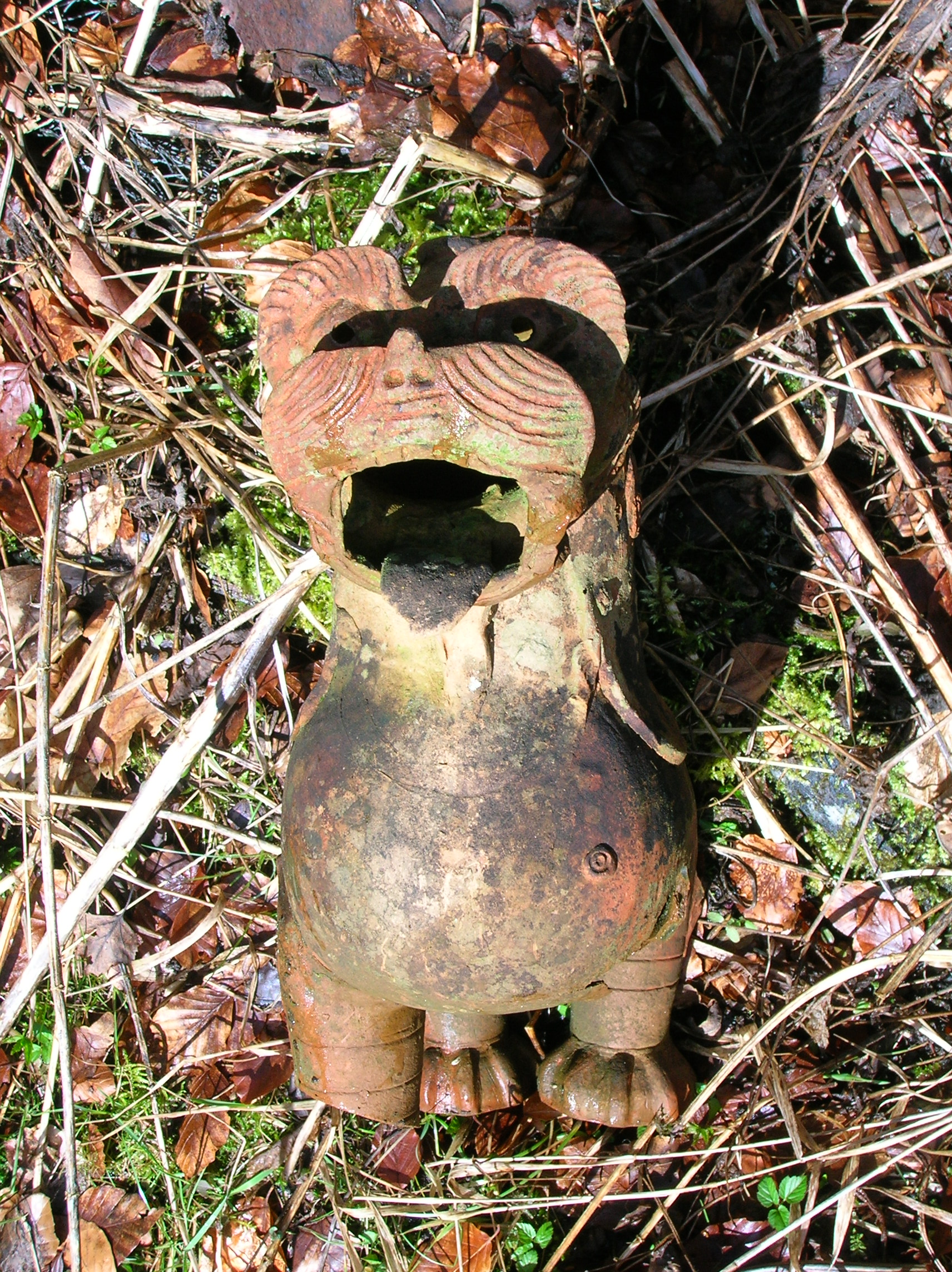
Front view of a Dragon Jardiniere at Kindrogan

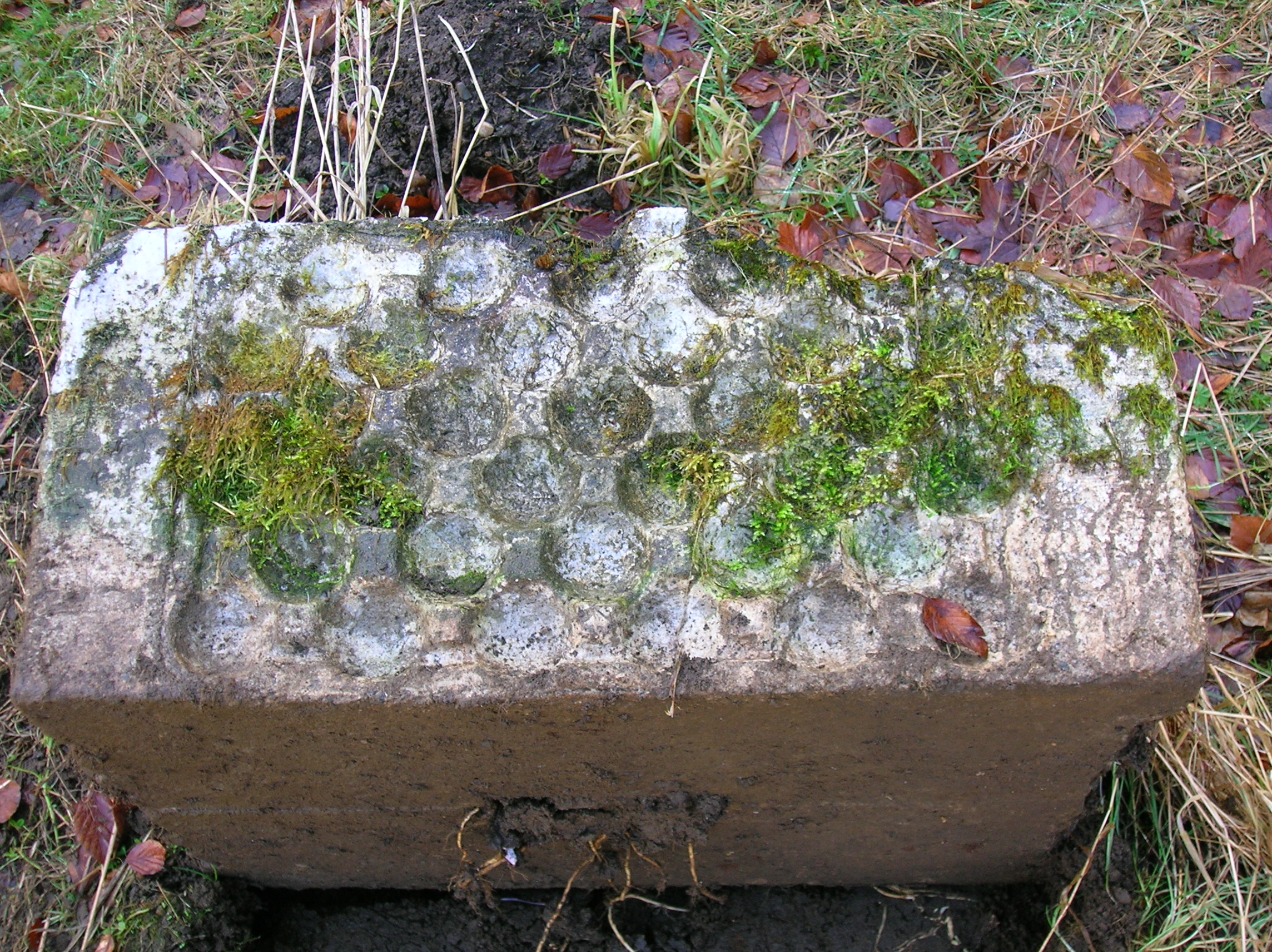
A highly ornate planter or trough near the walled garden

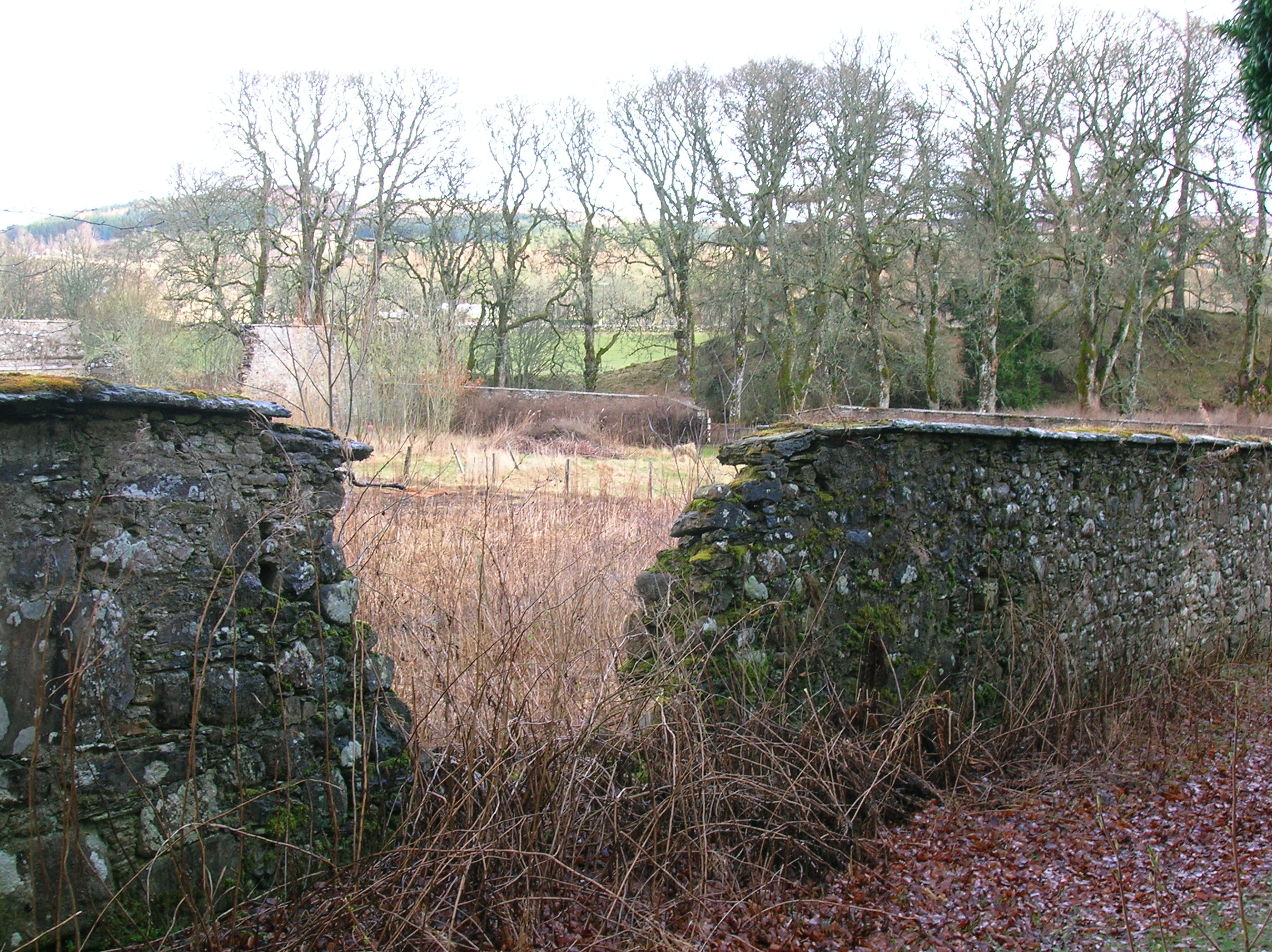
The old walled garden at Kindrogan

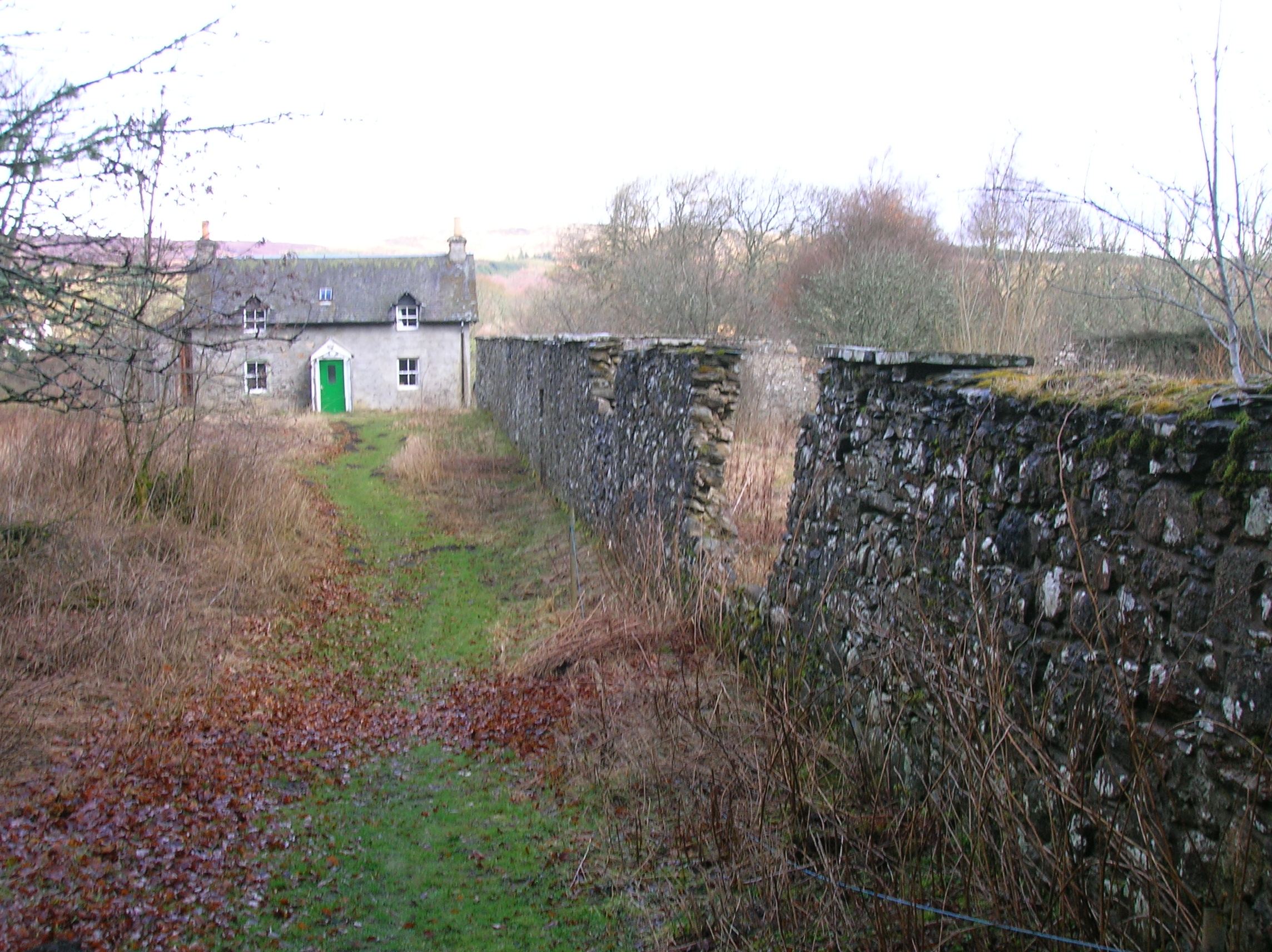
The old gardener's house and walled garden at Kindrogan

== Myths and legends ==
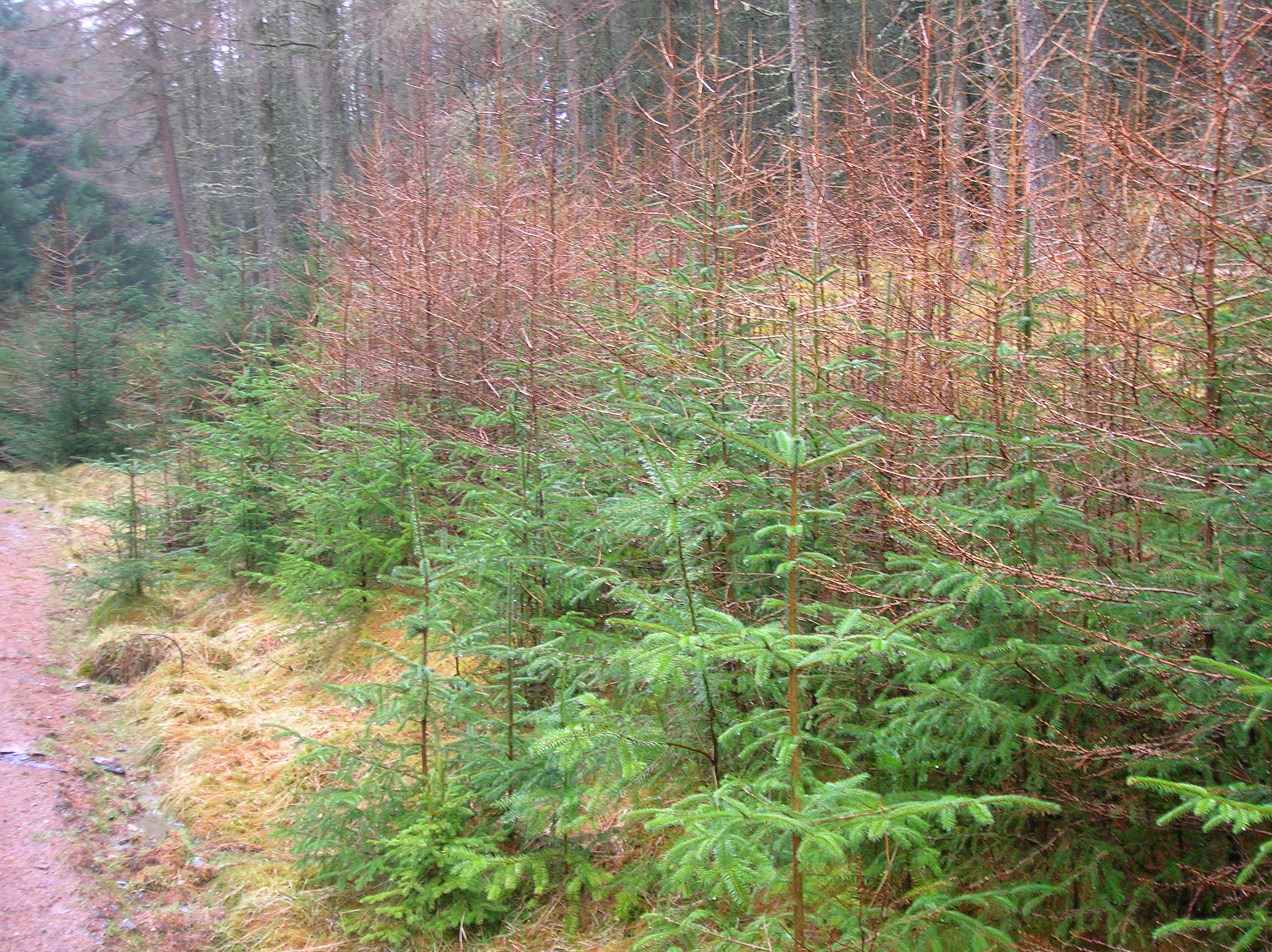
Self-seeded Sitka spruce in Kindrogan woods.

The Barons Ruadh, later Reid, were the local lairds and chiefs of the Robertson Clan. The Balvarran stone in the area has four deep cupmarks in it, anciently used for holding water to baptise the laird's son. The last chief was not baptised at the stone and this was said to be the reason for his having no son and heir.

The Giant's Grave and standing stone is at Enochdhu, supposedly the burial place of Prince Ard-fhuil (meaning of high or noble blood) who was killed hereabouts, with two of his men, whilst fighting the Danes in AD 903. They were supposedly buried head to foot, 'explaining' the size of the grave. The Danes are buried at the Grey Hollow nearby.

Donal Mor and his eight daughters are said to have once lived in a house situated on what is now the lawn in front of the present day Kindrogan House. The family had built an underground kitchen in the area where they slaughtered and cooked stolen cattle, however the locals became suspicious and they were caught redhanded, banished and their home burnt down. Donal himself hid in a cave at Kindrogan Rock, however he was discovered and in desperation hanged himself at Cnoc Dhimhnuill Mhor, (Donal Mor's Knowe).

Several other standing stones and cup marked stones are located in the vicinity of Kindrogan House.
