= James Stevenson =

James Stevenson may refer to:

- James Stevenson (actor) (born 1981), American actor
- James Stevenson (illustrator) (1929–2017), artist and author of children's books
- James Stevenson (musician) (born 1958), English punk/alternative rock guitarist
- James Stevenson (East India Company officer) (died 1805), British East India Company officer
- James Stevenson, 1st Baron Stevenson (1873–1926), Member of House of Lords
- James S. Stevenson (1780–1831), U.S. Representative from Pennsylvania
- James Stevenson (geologist) (1840–1888), American geologist and anthropologist
- James Croesus Stevenson (1822–1903), philanthropist and landowner on Vulcano
- James Stevenson (Canadian politician) (1827–1910), Canadian MP
- James Stevenson (cyclist) (1877–1936), British Olympic cyclist
- James Stevenson, Lord Stevenson (1883–1963), Scottish judge and MP for Glasgow Camlachie, 1931–1935
- James Stevenson (footballer, born 1872) (1872–1925), Scottish footballer (Dumbarton, Preston, West Bromwich)
- James Stevenson (footballer, born 1877), Scottish footballer (Clyde, Derby County, Newcastle, Bristol City)
- James Stevenson (footballer, born 1903), (1903–1973), Scottish footballer (Third Lanark, South Shields, Stockport County)
- James Cochran Stevenson (1825–1905), English industrialist and politician
- James Stevenson (merchant) (1786–1864) Scottish merchant, fellow of the Royal Society of Edinburgh
- James Stevenson (cricketer) (1915–1993), Scottish cricketer
- James Stevenson (rugby union), Irish international rugby union player

== See also ==
- Jamie Stevenson (disambiguation)
- James Stephenson (disambiguation)
- Jim Stevenson (disambiguation)
- J. J. Stevenson (geologist) (John James Stevenson, 1841–1924), American geologist, different from the one listed above
- James Stevenson-Hamilton (1867–1957), first warden of South Africa's Sabi Nature Reserve
