= Hilda Runciman, Viscountess Runciman of Doxford =

British Liberal Party politician (1869–1956)

The Right Honourable The Viscountess Runciman of Doxford
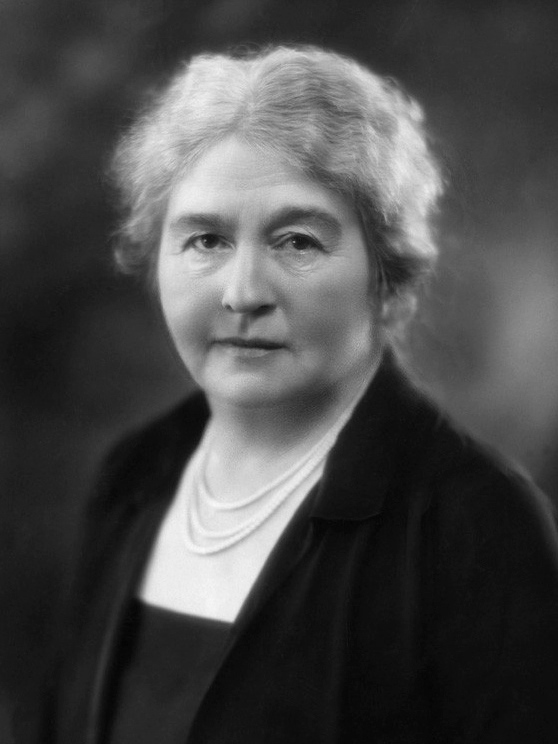
- Runciman in 1927

Member of Parliament for St Ives
- In office 6 March 1928 – 10 May 1929
- Preceded by: John Hawke
- Succeeded by: Walter Runciman

Personal details
- Born: 28 September 1869
- Died: 28 October 1956 (aged 87) London
- Party: Liberal Party
- Spouse: Walter Runciman (m. 1898; died 1949)
- Children: 5
- Parent: James Cochran Stevenson (father)
- Relatives: Flora Stevenson (aunt); Louisa Stevenson (aunt); James Stevenson (paternal grandfather)
- Education: Notting Hill High School
- Alma mater: Girton College, Cambridge

Hilda Runciman, Viscountess Runciman of Doxford (28 September 1869 – 28 October 1956) was a British Liberal Party politician.

== Family and education ==
A daughter of James Cochran Stevenson, a Liberal Member of Parliament for South Shields, Hilda Stevenson was educated at Notting Hill High School and Girton College, Cambridge, where she took first class honours in the History Tripos. In 1898 she married Walter Runciman, a rising politician. They had two sons and three daughters, including Leslie Runciman, 2nd Viscount Runciman of Doxford, Margaret Fairweather, one of the first eight women pilots in the Air Transport Auxiliary, and historian Steven Runciman.

== Political career ==
=== Local ===
She became the first woman member to be elected to the Newcastle on Tyne School Board. She was also a member of the Northumberland County Council Education Committee and one of the earliest women magistrates.

=== National ===
In the 1920s Runciman took on a more national political role. She served as president of the Women's National Liberal Federation, 1919–21, continuing to sit on its executive committee for many years. She also served as president of the Women's Free Church Council, was a member of the executive of the League of Nations Union, chaired the Westminster Housing Association and was a founder of the Westminster Housing Trust. In Liberal Party politics, she was a strong advocate of H. H. Asquith, and under her presidency, the Women's National Liberal Federation supported the maintenance of independent Liberalism and an end to the Lloyd George coalition.

=== Parliament ===
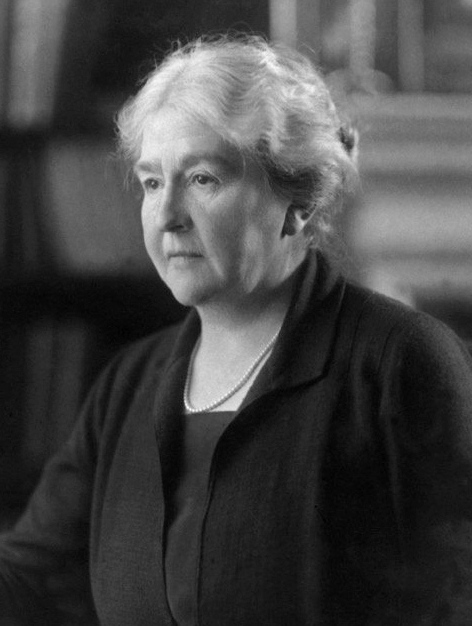
Viscountess Runciman

She became an MP in her own right in 1928, when she was elected in a by-election as Member of Parliament for St Ives in Cornwall, but she remained in Parliament for only one year and handed the seat to her husband at the 1929 general election. The 'halo effect' of women taking a parliamentary seat and then handing it over to their husband accounted for the election of ten women MPs (nearly a third of the women elected to Parliament) between both World Wars.

She herself fought the 1929 general election for the Liberals at Tavistock and had been invited to become the candidate by the local Liberal Association against the wishes of national headquarters, which was apparently unhappy that she was not a supporter of the party leader David Lloyd George. She narrowly failed to gain Tavistock from the Conservatives by just 152 votes.

== Titles ==
In 1937 her husband became Viscount Runciman of Doxford, and she was styled as Viscountess Runciman of Doxford.

== Death ==
Hilda Runciman died of heart failure at her home, 73 Portland Place, London, on 28 October 1956, aged 87.

Party political offices
Preceded by Laura McLaren	President of the Women's Liberal Federation; 1919–1921	Succeeded by Viscountess Cowdray
Parliament of the United Kingdom
Preceded by John Hawke	Member of Parliament for St Ives; 1928–1929	Succeeded by Walter Runciman
