= J. J. Stevenson =

British architect (1831–1908)

John James Stevenson FSA FRSE FRIBA (24 August 1831 – 5 May 1908), usually referred to as J. J. Stevenson, was a Scottish architect of the late-Victorian era. Born in Glasgow, he worked in Glasgow, Edinburgh and London. He is particularly associated with the Queen Anne revival style.

== Early life and education ==
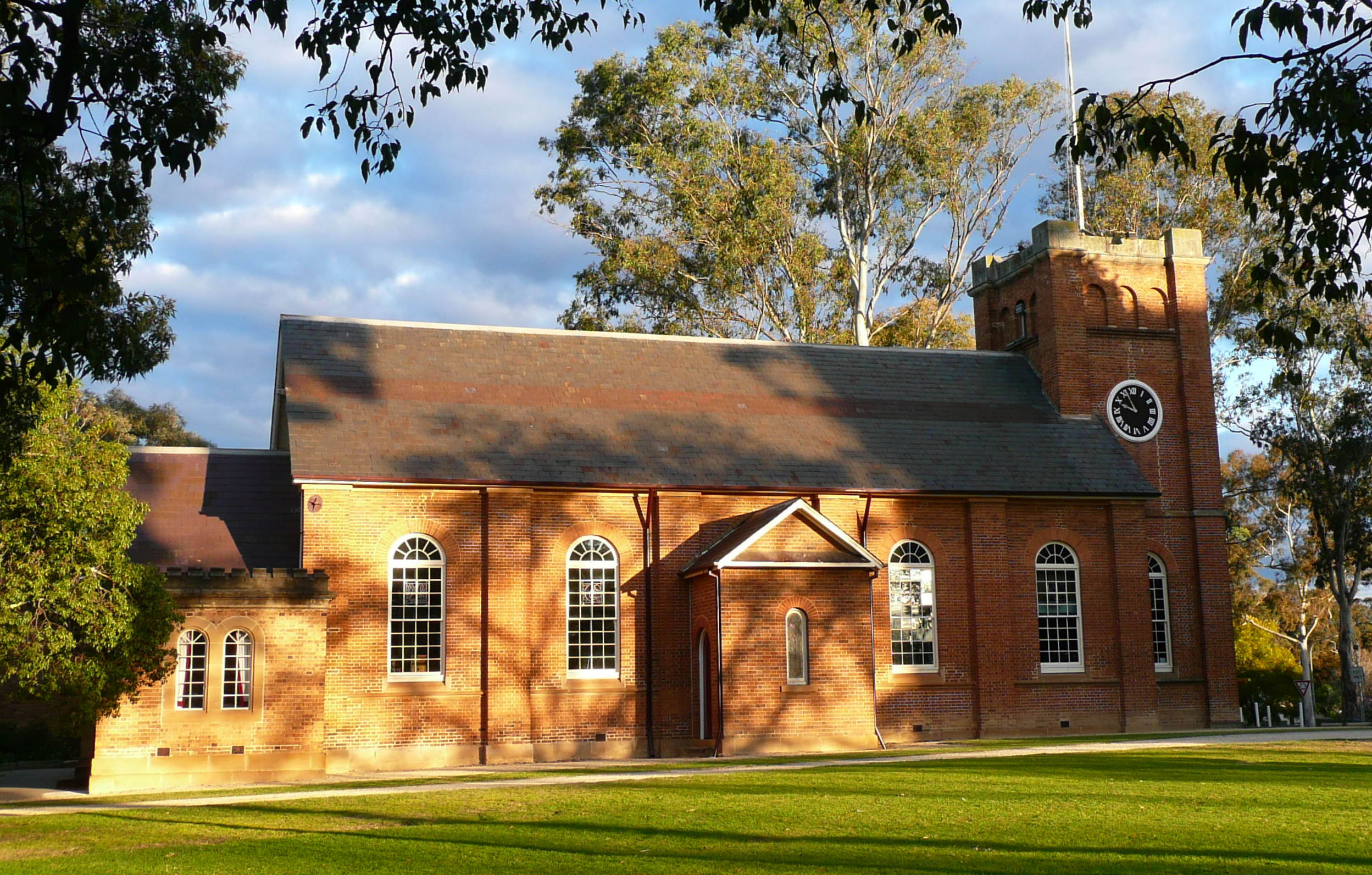
Anglican Church, Campbelltown

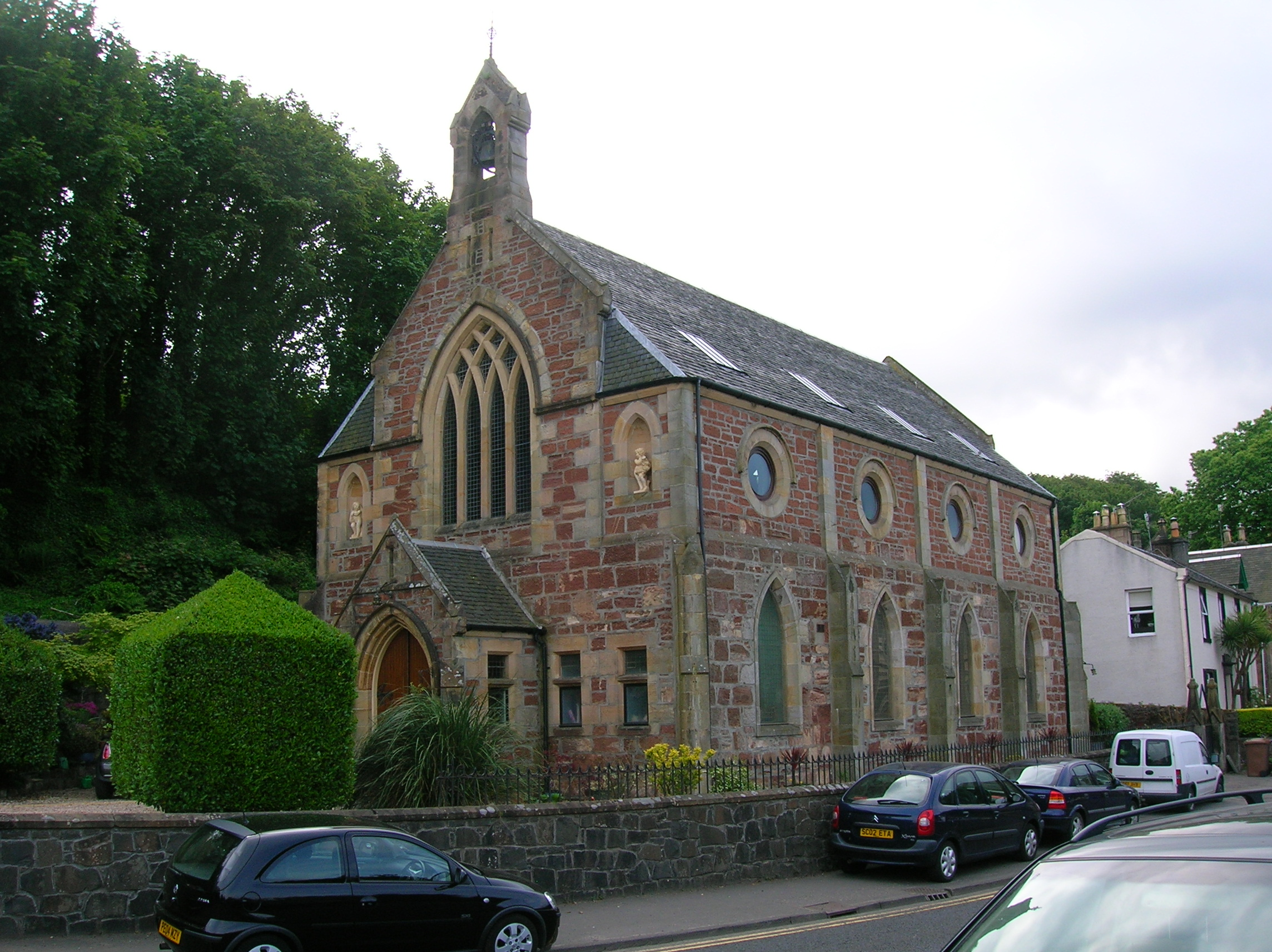
Parish Church, Fairlie, North Ayrshire

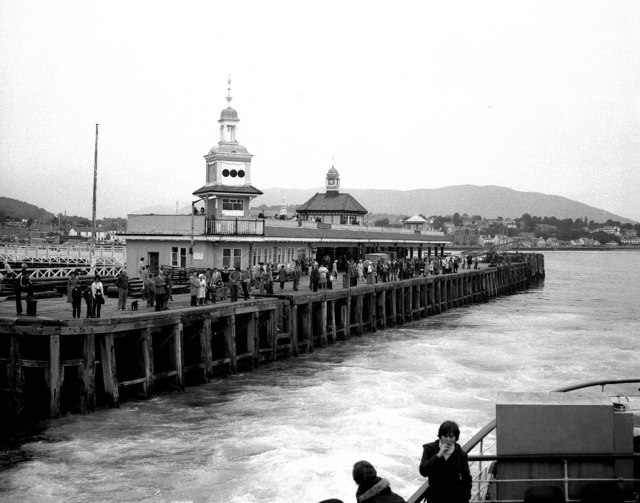
Dunoon Pier

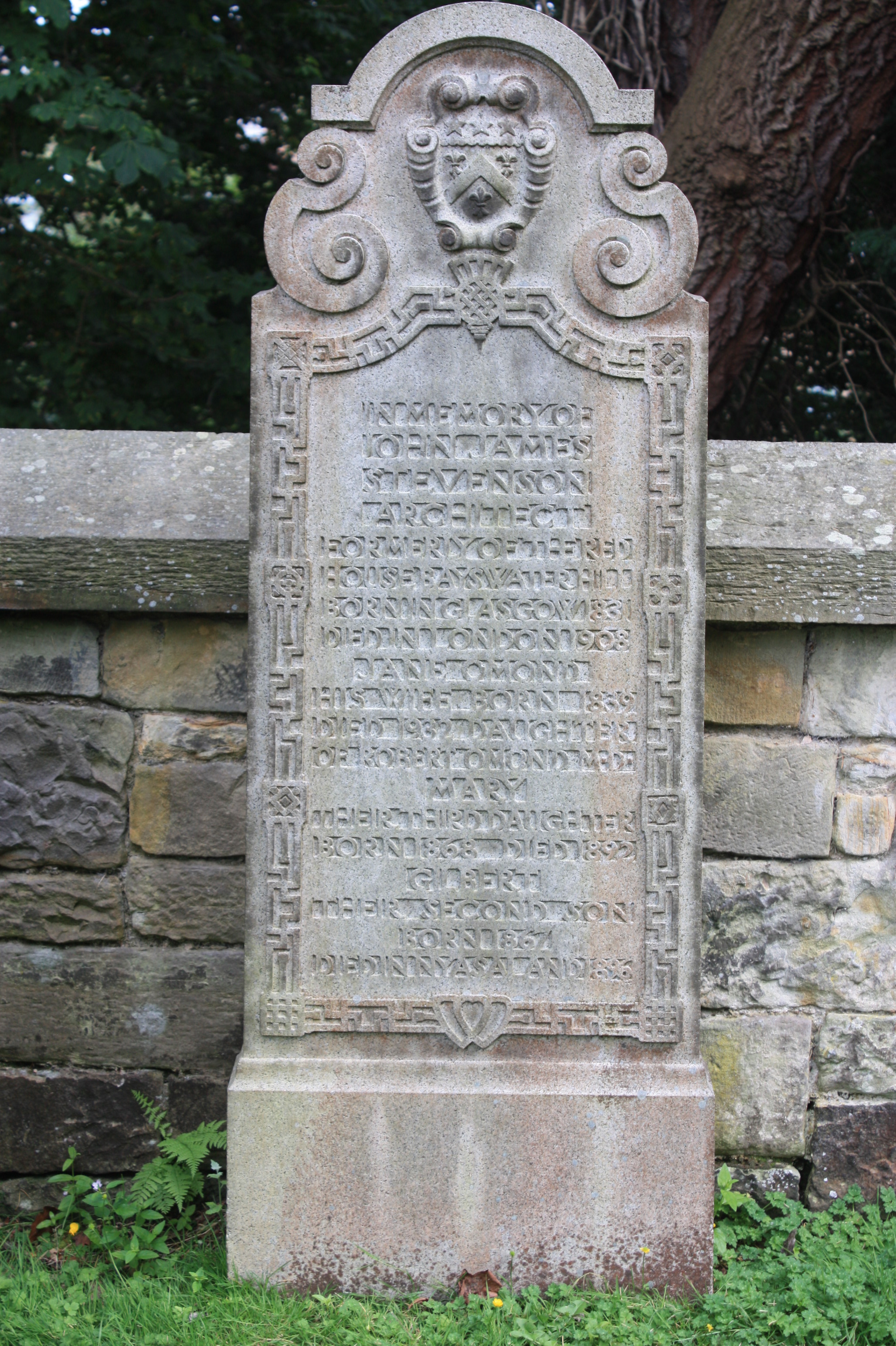
The grave of J. J. Stevenson, Dean Cemetery, Edinburgh

Stevenson was born in Glasgow on 24 August 1831, the sixth of ten children of Jane Stewart Shannan (daughter of Alexander Shannan, a Greenock merchant) and James Stevenson, a merchant of Glasgow. His siblings included Flora Stevenson, James Cochran Stevenson and Louisa Stevenson; James Croesus Stevenson was his cousin.

His early education was at Glasgow High School.

== Career ==
Stevenson trained as an architect with David Bryce in Edinburgh and Sir George Gilbert Scott in London. He then worked with Campbell Douglas in Glasgow, becoming a partner in 1860, they then jointly moved to a property at 24 George Street in Edinburgh, sharing the space with the stained glass artist Daniel Cottier. From 1870 he worked in London. Here he built the "Red House" in Bayswater Hill as his own home.

Author of the architecture text, House Architecture (1880), Stevenson also wrote on town planning and the preservation of historic buildings, criticising the "dull and uninteresting" architecture of his age and the "infatuation for making streets straight".

He also designed the interiors of several ocean liners.

In 1868 he was elected a Fellow of the Royal Society of Edinburgh, his proposer being Alexander Keith Johnston.

== Buildings ==
Stevenson's work in Scotland was mainly ecclesiastical, including the design of churches in Gilmerton, Crieff, Perth, Stirling, and Glasgow. His work in England was mainly domestic and educational buildings in London, Oxford and Cambridge.

His buildings include:

- Kelvinside Parish Church, Great Western Road, Glasgow (1862)
- Campsie Free Church (1863)
- Clola Free Church (1863)
- Dunoon Pier and Offices (1867)
- Palace Gate, Kensington, London (1873–75)
- Jamaican High Commission in London, Exhibition Road, Kensington, London (1876)
- University Laboratories, Cambridge University (1876–79)
- Lugar Lodge, 14 Melbury Road, Kensington, London (the home and artist's studio of Colin Hunter; 1876)
- Ken Hill, Snettisham, Norfolk (1879-80)
- South side of Cadogan Square, London (1879–85)
- Green House, Banbury Road, Oxford (home of T.H. Green; 1881)
- St Leonard's-in-the-Fields Church, Perth (1882–1885)
- Parish Church, Fairlie, North Ayrshire (1883)
- Forgandenny Free Church (1885)
- Balliol Croft (now Marshall House), off Madingley Road, Cambridge (home of Alfred Marshall; 1886)
- Heycock Wing, New Museums Site, University of Cambridge (1886–88)
- Stevenson Building, Christ's College, Cambridge (1888–89)
- Kelvin Stevenson Memorial Church, Belmont Street Bridge, Glasgow (1898–1902)

== Personal life ==
In 1861, he married Jane Omond (1839–1932), daughter of Mary Eliza Traill and Robert Omond. His brother-in-law was Robert Traill Omond.

He died at his home, 4 Porchester Gardens in London on 5 May 1908 and his body was returned to Edinburgh for burial in Dean Cemetery. The grave lies against the southern boundary. He is buried with his wife Jane and their children.
