= Localization and Urbanization Economies =

Localization and urbanization economies are two types of external economies of scale or agglomeration economies. External economies of scale result from an increase in the productivity of an entire industry, region, or economy due to factors outside of an individual company. There are three sources of external economies of scale: input sharing, labor market pooling, and knowledge spillover (Marshall, 1920).

Localization economies occur when an increase in the size of an industry in a city leads to an increase in productivity of a particular activity. Alfred Marshall (1920) introduced the idea that the localization of industry can increase productivity in his book Principles of Economics. The highly concentrated high tech industry in Silicon Valley exemplifies industrial localization. Although the cost of labor and land in Silicon Valley is very high, high tech firms continue to locate there because of the added benefit they receive from their proximity to a high-skilled labor pool. The size of the high tech industry creates positive externalities for each firm located in Silicon Valley.

Urbanization economies arise when the size of the city leads to an increase in productivity. Los Angeles exemplifies urbanization economies in that it has no single dominant industry, yet continues to grow. Firms which locate in Los Angeles benefit from the common resources and large labor pool found in the city. Common resources such as roads, buildings and power supply benefit firms in cities regardless of their industry. Also, firms have better access to labor by locating in cities. The urban environment creates positive externalities that benefit several different industries. Jane Jacobs is often credited with the idea that urban diversity and a city’s size lead to agglomeration economies. However, Marshall’s (1920) discussion of urban diversity predates her work.
