= Christian Guthrie Wright =

Scottish campaigner for women's higher education

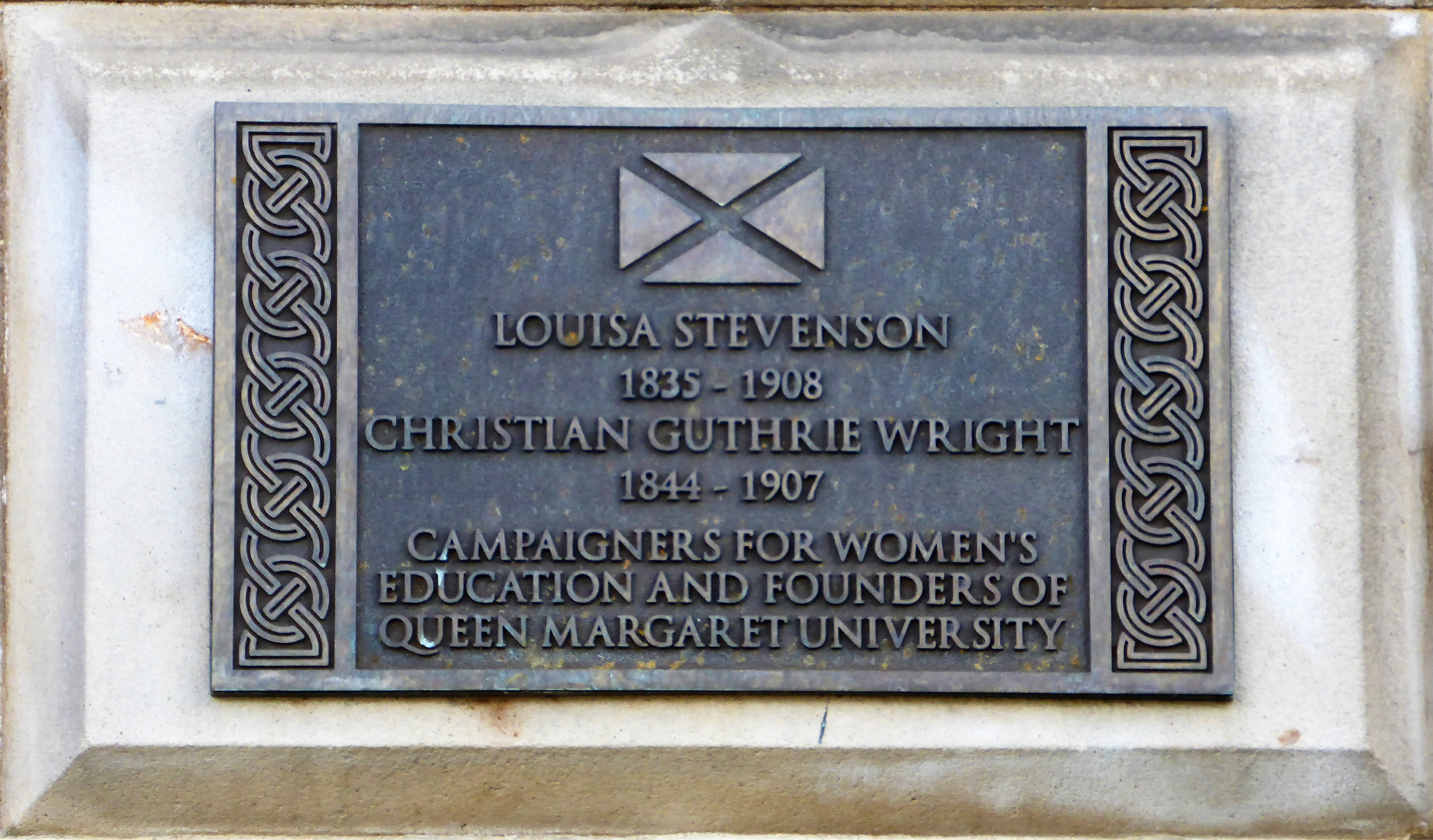
Plaque to Louisa Stevenson and Christian Guthrie Wright at 5 Atholl Crescent, Edinburgh

Christian Edington Guthrie Wright (19 April 1844 – 24 February 1907) was a Scottish campaigner for women's higher education, co-founder of the Edinburgh School of Cookery which was the forerunner to Queen Margaret University.

== Early life ==
Christian Edington Guthrie Wright was born in Glasgow, and raised by her father, Harry Guthrie Wright, after her mother Christian Edington died soon after giving birth. Her father worked for a railway company. The two Wrights moved to Edinburgh together when Christian was a young woman.

== Career ==
Christian Guthrie Wright was a founder of the Ladies' Edinburgh Debating Society, and an officer of the Edinburgh Association for the University Education of Women. With support from the women in their reform-minded circle (notably Flora Stevenson), she and Louisa Stevenson (Flora's sister) founded the Edinburgh School of Cookery in 1875. The school gave public lectures and demonstrations, about nutrition and hygiene, and trained young women to cook in homes, and in institutional settings like hospitals and schools, improving the possibilities for expertise and paid employment for working-class Scottish women. In 1876, similar schools in Liverpool, Leeds, and Glasgow (founded by Grace Paterson, joined with Guthrie Wright's school to standardize instruction as the Northern Union of Training Schools of Cookery. The Edinburgh school left the coalition in 1878.

Guthrie Wright presented a paper at the Domestic Economy Congress in Birmingham, 1877, organized by the Royal Society of Arts. In 1879 Guthrie Wright compiled and edited the School Cookery Book, a compilation of basic, nutritious, and economical recipes aimed at school students. In 1887 she was involved in creating and funding the Queen Victoria's Jubilee Institute for Nurses, an early training program focused on home care.

== Death and legacy ==
Guthrie Wright died in 1907, aged 62 years. Ethel Maud De la Cour, was promoted to Principal of the cookery school which went on to define Domestic Science teaching for Scotland.

In 1930, Guthrie Wright's school became the Edinburgh College of Domestic Science. In 1972 the name changed again, to Queen Margaret College (now Queen Margaret University). There is a Historic Scotland plaque on the site of the school's Atholl Crescent location, naming Stevenson and Guthrie Wright as the school's co-founders.

One of Christian Guthrie Wright's cottages in the Colinton suburb of Edinburgh, designed by Sir Robert Lorimer in 1896, still stands on Pentland Avenue, and is a point of interest on the walking tour of the parish.
