= Jamie Stevenson =

Jamie Stevenson may refer to:

- Jamie Stevenson (orienteer) (born 1975), British orienteer
- Jamie Stevenson (Australian footballer) (born 1966), Australian rules footballer
- Jamie Stevenson (Scottish footballer) (born 1984), Scottish footballer

== See also ==
- James Stevenson (disambiguation)
