= James Cochran Stevenson =

British industrialist and Liberal politician (1825-1905)

James Cochran Stevenson JP MP

Member of Parliament for South Shields
- In office 1868–1895
- Preceded by: Robert Ingham
- Succeeded by: William Robson

Personal details
- Born: 9 October 1825 Glasgow, Scotland
- Died: 11 January 1905 (aged 79)
- Party: Liberal
- Spouse: Elisa Ramsay Anderson (m. 1855)
- Parents: James Stevenson (father); Jane Stewart Shannan (mother)
- Relatives: Hilda Stevenson (daughter); Walter Runciman (son-in-law); Sir Kenneth Skelton Anderson (son-in-law); Flora Stevenson (sister); Louisa Stevenson (sister); John James Stevenson (brother); James Croesus Stevenson (cousin)
- Education: Glasgow University
- Military career
- Allegiance: United Kingdom
- Branch: British Army
- Rank: Lieutenant Colonel
- Unit: 3rd Durham Artillery Volunteers

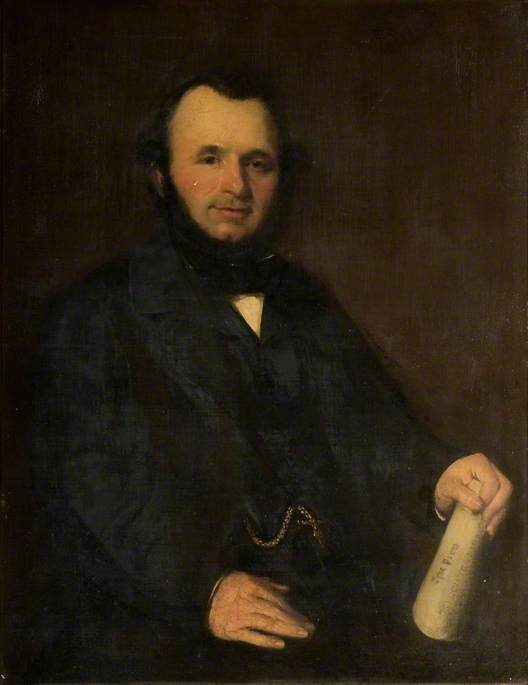

James Cochran Stevenson, JP, MP (9 October 1825 – 11 January 1905) was a British industrialist at Tyneside and a Liberal politician who sat in the House of Commons from 1868 to 1895.

== Life ==
Stevenson was born at Glasgow, the son of James Stevenson, a Glasgow merchant, and his wife, Jane Stewart Shannan (daughter of Alexander Shannan, a Greenock merchant). He was educated in Glasgow (where he was gold medalist in junior and senior mathematical classes), and at Glasgow University.

The family moved to Jarrow in 1844 when his father became a partner in the Jarrow Chemical Company, which was an alkali works. After his father retired in 1854, James managed the company with one of his father's partners, John Williamson. Under their control it became the second-largest chemical company in the UK.

Stevenson took an active part in civic life, campaigning for improvements in sanitation, road-widening, river Tyne development schemes and more. He was a Life Commissioner appointed by the Tyne Improvement Act, and chairman of the Tyne Pilotage Commissioners. He was mayor of South Shields and a JP for County Durham and for South Shields. He was Lieutenant-Colonel commanding the 3rd Durham Artillery Volunteers, a member of General Council of Glasgow and a Fellow of the Institute of Chemistry. He was also, for a time, the owner of the Shields Gazette.

At the 1868 general election Stevenson was elected as the Member of Parliament (MP) for South Shields. He held the seat until he retired from Parliament at the 1895 general election.

Stevenson died at the age of 79.

== Legacy ==
Stevenson was a religious man with a strong sense of public duty and commitment to the local area, but his chemical works, using the Leblanc process, caused pollution and imposed harsh working conditions on employees, despite being the first Tyneside factory to offer a Saturday half-holiday.

== Family ==
Stevenson married Elisa Ramsay Anderson, daughter of Rev. James Anderson, D.D., of Morpeth in 1855. Their daughter Hilda was also an MP. She married Walter Runciman, 1st Viscount Runciman of Doxford (1870–1949), who was an important member of the Baldwin and Chamberlain governments in the 1930s. Their second son, the historian James Cochran Stevenson Runciman, known commonly as Sir Steven Runciman, was named after Stevenson. Another of Stevenson's daughters, Louisa Mary, married Sir Kenneth Skelton Anderson, 1st Baronet of Ardtaraig (1866–1942), the son of the Rev. Alexander Anderson and Mary (Gavin) Anderson, of Aberdeenshire. He was the owner of the Orient Steam Navigation Company.

James Cochran Stevenson had nine siblings, including Flora Stevenson, J. J. Stevenson and Louisa Stevenson.

Parliament of the United Kingdom
Preceded by Robert Ingham	Member of Parliament for South Shields; 1868–1895	Succeeded by William Robson
