= Jane Arthur =

Scottish philanthropist, feminist and activist (1827–1907)

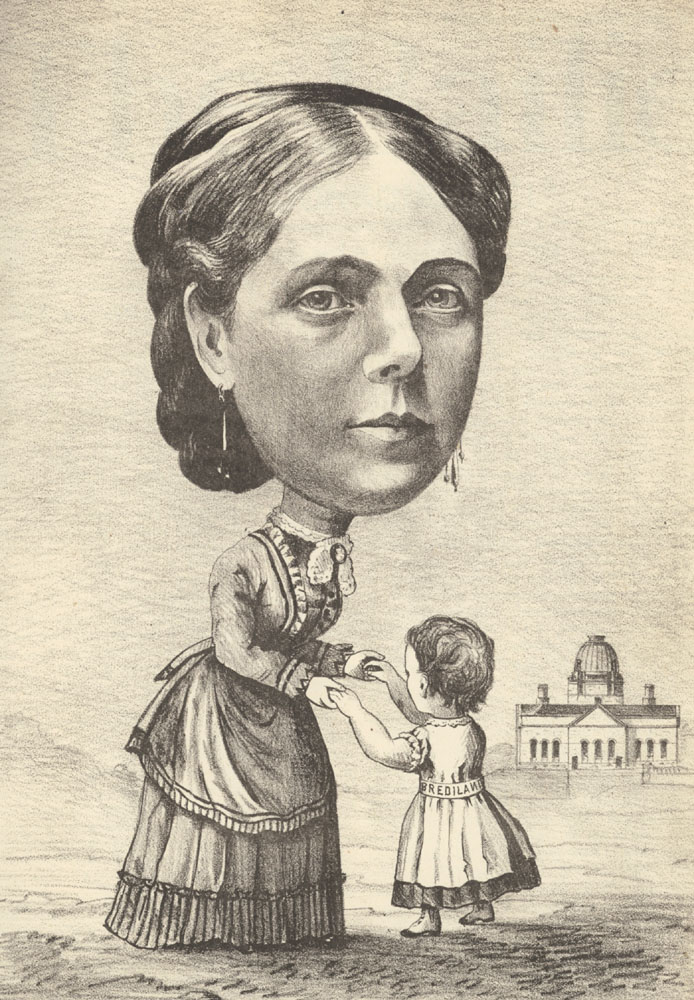
- Born: Jane Glen; 18 November 1827; Foxbar, Renfrewshire, Scotland
- Died: 25 May 1907 (aged 79)
- Known for: Feminist activist and social reformer
- Spouse: James Arthur
- Children: several including Lord Glenarthur

Jane Arthur (18 November 1827 – 25 May 1907), was a Scottish feminist, philanthropist and activist. She was the first woman to be elected to a Scottish school board.

== Life ==
Jane Glen was born in Foxbar in Renfrewshire on 18 November 1827 to Jessie Fulton and Thomas Glen. Her family were related to the thread manufacturer, the Coats Group Coats family. In 1847, at the age of about 20, she married James Arthur who was a draper in Paisley. The Arthurs' successful business was wholesale clothing and this funded their estate at Barshaw. Their children included Matthew who became Lord Glenarthur.

Elections of women to school boards came into force with the Education (Scotland) Act 1872. In 1873 Arthur became the first Scottish woman to stand for and be elected to a board when she was elected to the Paisley school board. This was soon followed by the election of Phoebe Blyth and Flora Stevenson to the Edinburgh school board.

Jane Arthur campaigned for women's suffrage, as well as temperance, and she provided bursaries for a Renfrewshire student and for a female medical student. In 1892 she created the Arthur Fellowship to promote the medical education of women. Arthur was also much involved with providing for the needs of the sick - she created a Dorcas Society in the late 1880s to give clothing to those recovering at Paisley Infirmary, and with her husband's help give soup and bread to poor people who had been recently sent home from the hospital. In 1903 the Jane Arthur Fund was set up to pay for the recovery of poor patients. Jane was also the vice President of the Paisley Ladies' Sanitary Association, which, in 1866, initiated a public baths scheme. Her sister was the president. She and her husband also contributed to the building of the Paisley model lodging-house and provided mid-morning tea for the inmates of the poor house. She was active in the suffrage movement, and was supported in this by the male members of her family.
