= Jim Stevenson =

Jim Stevenson may refer to:

- Jim Stevenson (footballer, born 1935) (1935–2009), Scottish footballer for Dundee
- Jim Stevenson (footballer, born 1881) (1881–1946), footballer for Nottingham Forest and Gillingham
- Jim Stevenson (footballer, born 1992), English football midfielder
- Jim Stevenson (politician), municipal politician in Calgary, Alberta
- Jim Stevenson (psychologist) (born 1947), British psychologist
- Jim Stevenson (rugby union), Scottish former rugby union player
- Jim Stevenson (decathlete), British athlete at the athletics at the 1993 Summer Universiade – Men's decathlon

== See also ==
- James Stevenson (disambiguation)
