= Phoebe Blyth =

Scottish philanthropist

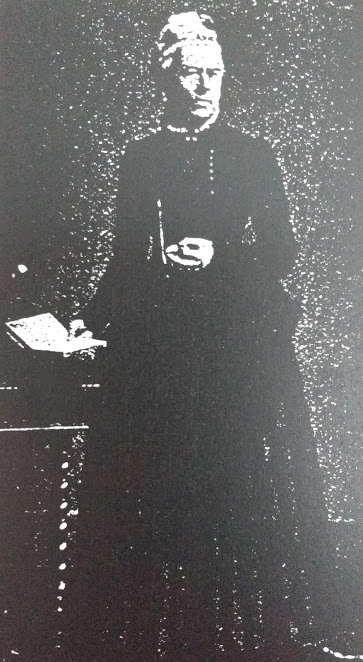
- Phoebe Blyth, taken from her brother Edward Laurence Ireland Blyth's genealogy book on the Blyth family.
- Born: 5 April 1816; Newington, Edinburgh
- Died: 12 February 1898 (aged 81); Edinburgh
- Known for: Campaign for the employment of women and one of the first Scottish women to be elected to public office.
- Parent(s): Robert Brittain Blyth and Barbara Cooper

Phoebe Blyth (5 April 1816 – 12 February 1898) was a Scottish philanthropist, educationist and a leading campaigner for opening up opportunities for women in professional employment.

== Early life and education ==
Phoebe Blyth was born in the Newington area of Edinburgh in 1816. Her father was Robert Brittain Blyth, a metal merchant, and her mother was Barbara Cooper. The family were active members of the Church of Scotland and Blyth's youngest brother was the Reverend Robert Blyth; a committed advocate for Scottish Sabbath schools. Another brother was the civil engineer Benjamin Blyth.

Blyth was educated at Mr Andrews's school, thought to be one of the best private schools for girls in Edinburgh at the time. There she learned geography, elocution, French, drawing, music, and dancing while her grandmother also taught her the art of housekeeping and nursing.

== Campaign for the employment of women ==
In 1859, the Society for Promoting the Employment of Women was founded in London by Jessie Boucherett, Barbara Bodichon and Adelaide Anne Proctor to promote the training and employment of women.

Blyth looked to create a counterpart organisation in Scotland and was one of the founding members of the Edinburgh Society for Promoting the Employment of Women in 1860. This society created a register where potential employers and employees were paid a fee. This laid the groundwork for providing women with remunerative employment.

From 1860 to 1863, the registry list included:

- teachers in every department of schools, families, or private instruction
- companions
- female missionaries
- Bible women
- sick nurses
- seamstresses
- shop assistants
- domestic servants.

Both Blyth and her brother, Robert, were also members of the National Association for the Promotion of Social Science which had been newly formed in 1857. It pursued issues in public health, industrial relations, penal reform, and female education. When the association held its conference in Edinburgh in 1863, Blyth presented a paper strongly advocating that girls should be educated for employment and receive practical training in household management.

== The Ladies' Edinburgh Magazine ==
Blyth also wrote for The Ladies' Edinburgh Magazine, previously known as 'The Attempt', and published by the same group of women who had formed the Ladies' Edinburgh Debating Society in 1865. Blyth wrote the first of a series of eight articles published in the magazine in 1875 on 'the industries and employments open to educated women':

"In former generations, when the proper sphere of woman was discussed, the question was generally decided by the consideration of any course of action being 'womanly' or 'unwomanly'. There was and is no fixed standard by which this term can be applied, but this did not render it the less decisive; and under the shelter of it, strange inconsistencies were tolerated. It was 'womanly' to dance or sing before assembled thousands, but it was 'unwomanly' to speak to a small number, even if in behalf of the oppressed or wronged; it was 'womanly' to write weak or sentimental novels, but 'unwomanly' to approach grave and important subjects; it was 'womanly' to appear in the hunting-field and to be present at the death of a fox, but 'unwomanly' to come to the help of the sick and wounded; it was 'womanly' to use the needle, but not the graver's style; it was 'womanly' to starve for want of food, but 'unwomanly' or at least unlady-like, to work for self-support." - Woman's Work, an Introduction in the Ladies' Edinburgh Magazine (1875).

== The first Scottish women elected to public office ==
By 1872, Blyth and her fellow social reformer Flora Stevenson had forged a prominent role in Edinburgh public life. Both were instrumental in the local administration and implementation of the Education (Scotland) Act when it passed in 1872. Under this act, approximately thousand regional school boards were created at a stroke; the first public bodies in Scotland to be opened to women.

As a result, the first Scottish women to be elected to public office were Jane Arthur, elected in Glasgow in 1872, and then Phoebe Blyth and Flora Stevenson in Edinburgh in 1873. Blyth and Stevenson were also active in the movement for the opening of the medical profession and university education to women. Blyth was not, however, a campaigner in the movement for women's suffrage though she did support it.

Blyth served on the school board for eight years, retiring in 1881. During her time on the board, she promoted the educational value of teaching of cookery and household management for schoolgirls. Blyth was also convenor of the committee of domestic economy and convenor of the ladies' African committee of the Church of Scotland. Throughout her life, Blyth was also a committed philanthropist and regularly engaged in missionary activities.

== Death ==
Blyth died at her home, 27 Mansion House Road, in Edinburgh on 12 February 1898. She was buried at Grange Cemetery three days later. Her will left a trust of three hundred pounds a year to the support of “such indigent and infirm gentlewomen”, the recipients to be decided upon by female members of her extensive family. A portion of her estate was to be donated to hospitals, missions, asylums and sick societies in Edinburgh.

== See also ==
- Jane Arthur
- Flora Stevenson
- Sophia Jex-Blake
- Masson Hall
- 1872 Education Act
