= James Stephenson =

James Stephenson may refer to:

- James Stephenson (congressman) (1764–1833), U.S. Representative from Virginia
- James McNeil Stephenson (1796–1877), American lawyer, businessman and politician in Virginia
- James W. Stephenson (1806–1838), American militia officer and politician
- James Stephenson (engraver) (1808–1886), English engraver
- James Stephenson (actor) (1889–1941), British actor
- Jimmy Stephenson (1895–1958), English footballer
- James B. Stephenson (1916–2005), justice of the Kentucky Supreme Court
- Jim Stephenson (fl. 1940s–1960s), New Zealand footballer
- Jim Stephenson (Australian footballer) (born 1934), Australian rules footballer
- James E. Stephenson (fl. 1970s), mayor of Ann Arbor, Michigan, from 1973 to 1975, see Human Rights Party (United States)
- James M. Stephenson (born 1969), American composer
- James Stephenson (rugby union) (born 1990), English rugby union player

== See also ==
- James Stevenson (disambiguation)
