= Ethel De la Cour =

British college head and soroptimist (1869–1957)

Ethel De la Cour OBE, JP
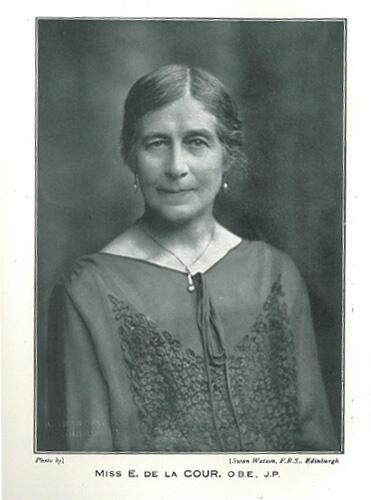
- De la Cour by Andrew Swan Watson, c. 1929 – c. 1930
- Born: Ethel Maud De la Cour; 6 December 1869; Edinburgh, Scotland
- Died: 25 April 1957 (aged 87); Edinburgh, Scotland
- Occupation: College head
- Employer: Edinburgh School of Cookery and Domestic Economy

Ethel Maud De la Cour OBE, JP (6 December 1869 – 25 April 1957) was a British college head of the Edinburgh School of Cookery and Domestic Economy (present-day Queen Margaret University) and soroptimist.

== Life ==
De la Cour was born on 6 December 1869 in Edinburgh to Lauritz Ulrich De la Cour, a Danish merchant and coalmaster, and Alice-Maria De la Cour (née Ellam). One of at least 9 siblings, De la Cour was educated in Edinburgh at Madame Froebel's School before attending a finishing school in Lausanne.

In 1896 she joined Christian Guthrie Wright and Louisa Stevenson who had founded a school for cookery in Edinburgh. She was employed as the assistant Secretary to Jessie Melvin who was the college's secretary. Guthrie Wright died suddenly in 1907, aged 62 years. Cour was promoted to be the professional Principal of the cookery school in 1909. The school went on to define Domestic Science teaching for Scotland, because the 1908 Education (Scotland) Act made Domestic Science an essential part of compulsory education.

During the first world war food was in short supply and eventually rationing was introduced. She was involved with groups who were encouraging the use of new recipes so that the maximum nutrition could be obtained from those foods that were available. She was awarded an MBE for this work.

In recognition of her contribution to domestic science teaching she was awarded an OBE in 1929. She was already a Justice of the Peace and Principal of the "Edinburgh School of Cookery and Domestic Economy".

In 1927 a branch of the Soroptimist International was started in Edinburgh. She was a founder member and the group's founding President.

In 1930 she retired and the school became the Edinburgh College of Domestic Science. In 1972 the name changed again, to Queen Margaret College (now Queen Margaret University). There is a Historic Scotland plaque on the site of the school's Atholl Crescent location, naming Stevenson and Guthrie Wright as the school's co-founders.

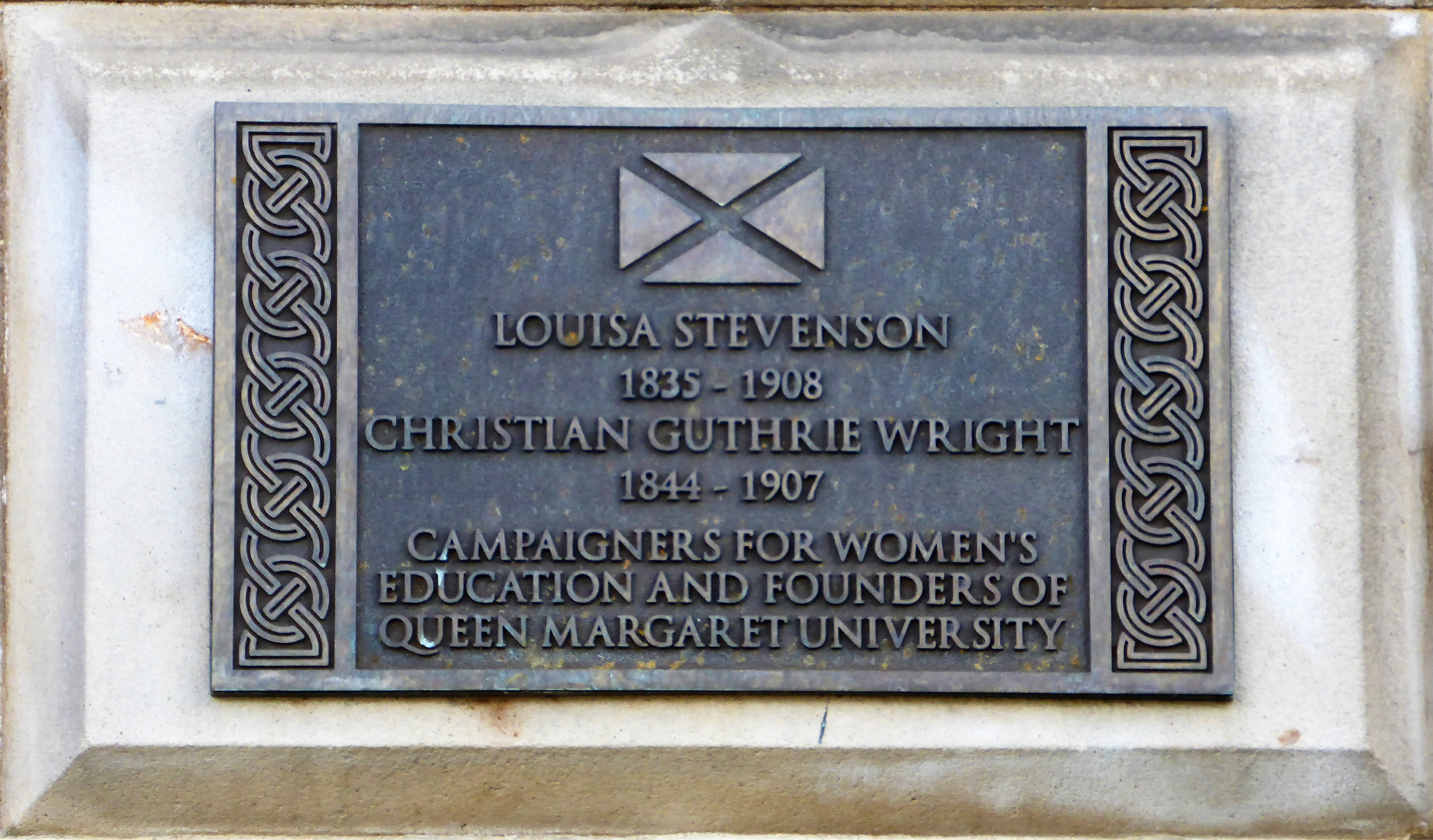
Plaque to Louisa Stevenson and Christian Guthrie Wright at 5 Atholl Crescent, Edinburgh

Cour died in Edinburgh in 1957.
