= Marshall House, Cambridge =

Building in Cambridge, England

Coordinates: 52.2112°N 0.1079°E

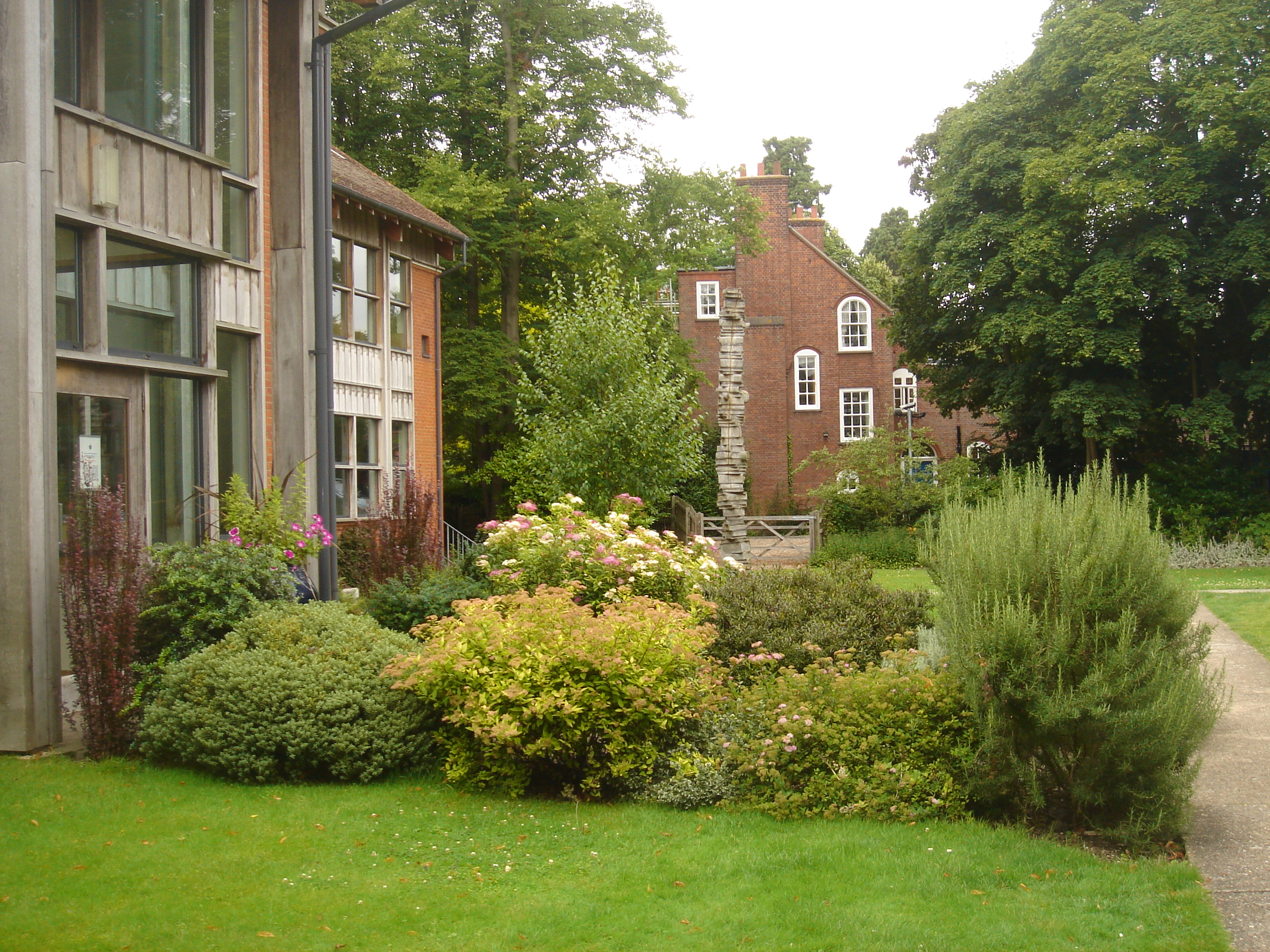
Marshall House and Lucy Cavendish College library on the left

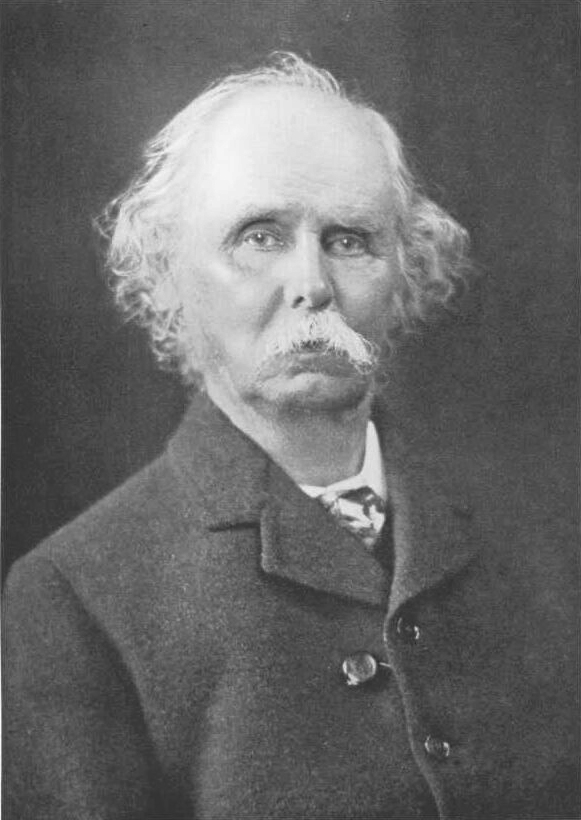
Alfred Marshall, former resident, after whom Marshall House is named

Marshall House has been the President's Lodge at Lucy Cavendish College, Cambridge, England, since 2001. It was designed by the Scottish architect J. J. Stevenson and built in 1886. It is a Grade II listed building.

In 1991 the college bought Balliol Croft, a neighbouring house to its grounds and former home of the economist Alfred Marshall and his wife Mary Paley Marshall, with whom he wrote his first economics textbook. He was a Fellow at St John's College, Cambridge, she at Newnham College, Cambridge. The building was renamed Marshall House in his honour and used for student accommodation. In 2001 it was converted back to its original layout and used as the President's Lodge.

== See also ==
- Listed buildings in Cambridge (west)
