= Benjamin Hall Blyth =

Scottish civil engineer

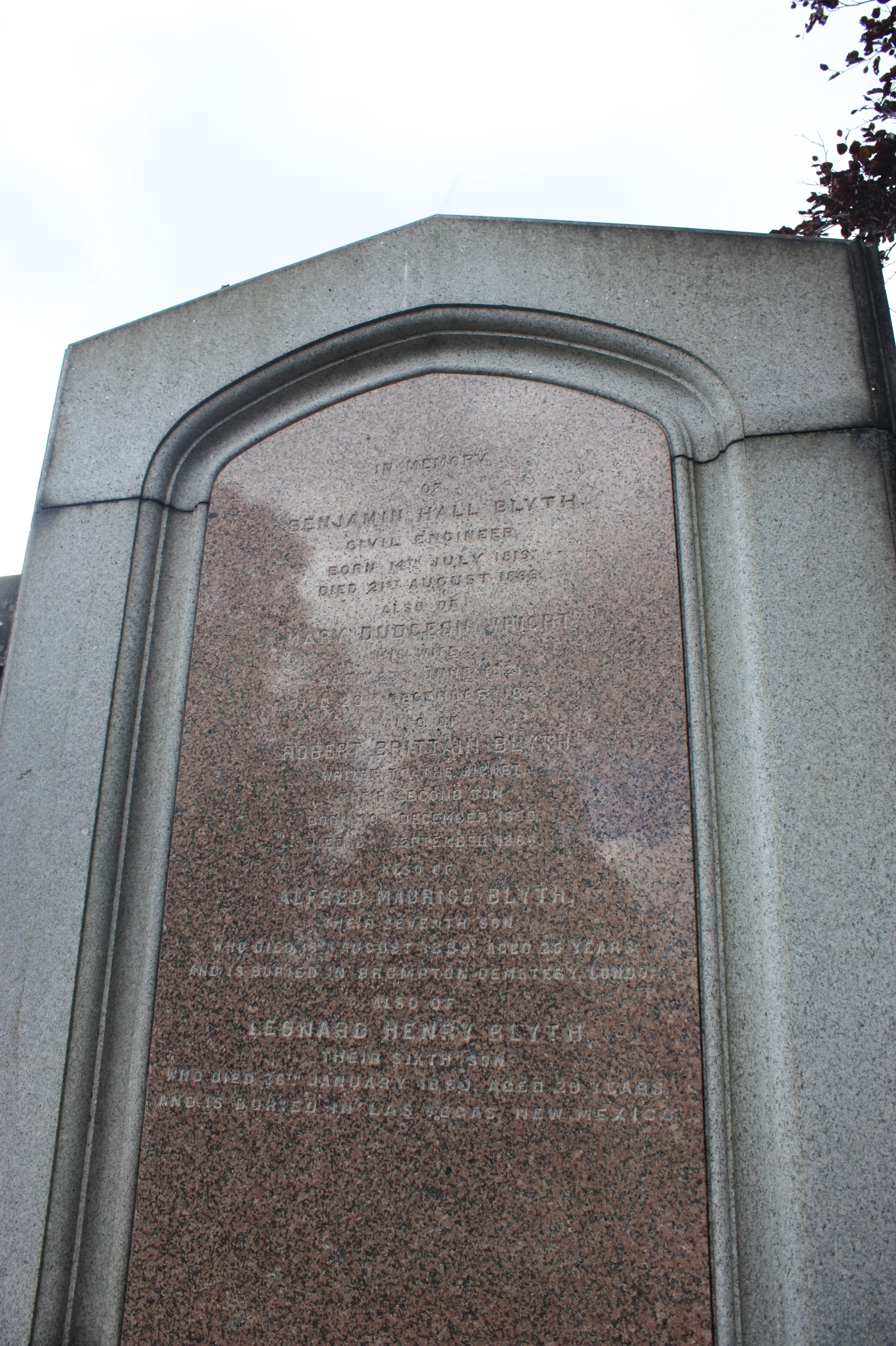
Grave of Benjamin Blyth, Grange Cemetery

Benjamin Hall Blyth (14 July 1819 – 21 August 1866) was a Scottish civil engineer.

== Life ==
Blyth was born at 26 Minto St in Newington, Edinburgh, the son of Robert Brittain Blyth, an iron merchant, and his wife, Barbara Cooper. He was their third son, and the first to survive to adulthood.

Blyth had exceptional mental arithmetic skills. At the age of six, he astonished his father by mentally calculating the exact number of seconds he had lived since birth to that moment. In school, he stood out in performance, especially excelling in arithmetic, geometry, and algebra. Blyth was trained as a railway engineer under an apprenticeship with Grainger & Miller, a railway contractor. In 1848, he established an engineering practice on the prestigious George Street (at no 124) in Edinburgh where it would remain for the next 100 years. In 1854, after his brother Edward Lawrence Ireland Blyth finished his own apprenticeship with Grainger & Miller, Benjamin took him into partnership in the renamed B & E Blyth.

The practice did work for the Caledonian, Glasgow and South Western, Scottish Central, Dundee and Perth, Great North of Scotland and Portpatrick railway companies.

Blyth was a first cousin of Arthur Blyth, who was three times premier of South Australia in the 19th century. Their fathers were brothers. His older sister was Scottish philanthropist, educational and campaigner Phoebe Blyth.

Blyth married Mary Dudgeon Wright in Leith, Edinburgh, on 1 August 1848. They initially lived at 26 Minto Street in the south of Edinburgh. Mary took on clerical duties in the early stages of Blyth's company. From 1854 they lived at 12 Hope Terrace, Edinburgh.

Blyth died from diabetes aggravated by overwork at home in North Berwick on 21 August 1866 and is buried in the Grange Cemetery, being survived by his wife, seven sons and two daughters.

His wife died of cancer and meningitis in 1868, and their children were subsequently raised by his wife's sister, Elizabeth Scotland Wright. His eldest son Benjamin Blyth II took over his father's practice and the company remains in business to this day as Blyth and Blyth.

His house served as the offices of Scottish Natural Heritage between 1950 and 2003 then reverted to its use as a family home.

== Employees ==
The harbour engineer, William Dyce Cay, worked under Blyth on the Castle Douglas to Portpatrick Railway in 1861.
