= Jamie Stevenson (Australian footballer) =

Australian rules footballer

Personal information
- Born: 15 April 1966 (age 60)
- Original team: Yarrawonga (O&MFL)
- Height: 191 cm (6 ft 3 in)
- Weight: 93 kg (205 lb)

Playing career^{1}
Years	Club	Games (Goals)
1985–1989	North Melbourne	16 (8)
- ^{1} Playing statistics correct to the end of 1989.

Jamie Stevenson (born 15 April 1966) is a former Australian rules footballer who played with North Melbourne in the Victorian Football League (VFL).

Stevenson, a Yarrawonga recruit, first broke into the North Melbourne side late in the 1985 season. He didn't play a senior game in 1986, then appeared in seven of the opening eight rounds in 1987, but missed the rest of the season when he broke his collarbone against Carlton. After playing only six more league games, Stevenson moved to Sturt, where he played from 1991 to 1993. He went to Albury in 1994 and during that season had a 13-goal haul in a game.
