= Louisa Stevenson =

Scottish campaigner for women's rights (1835-1908)

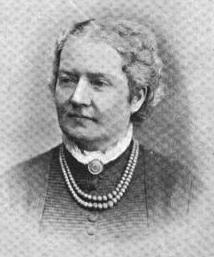
- Born: 15 July 1835; Glasgow, Scotland
- Died: 13 May 1908 (aged 72); Edinburgh, Scotland
- Resting place: Dean Cemetery, Edinburgh
- Known for: Campaigner for Scottish women's university education, women's suffrage and effective nursing.
- Father: James Stevenson
- Relatives: Flora Stevenson (sister); John James Stevenson (brother); James Cochran Stevenson (brother); James Croesus Stevenson (cousin)
- Honours: LLD

Louisa Stevenson (15 July 1835 – 13 May 1908) was a Scottish campaigner for women's university education, women's suffrage and effective, well-organised nursing. She was the co-founder of Edinburgh’s Queen Margaret University.

== Family ==
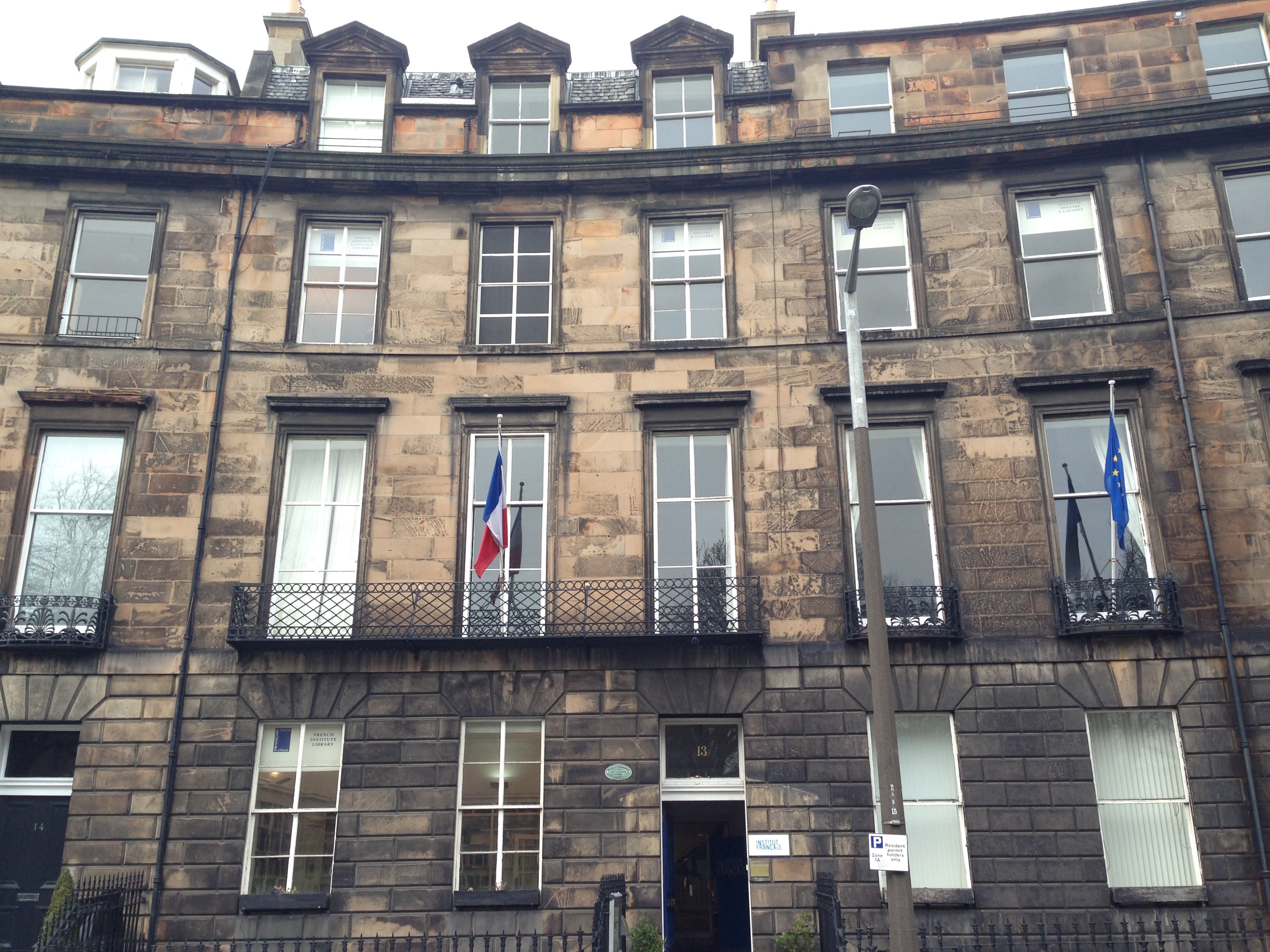
13 Randolph Crescent, Edinburgh, home of Flora and Louisa Stevenson, Scottish campaigners for women's rights

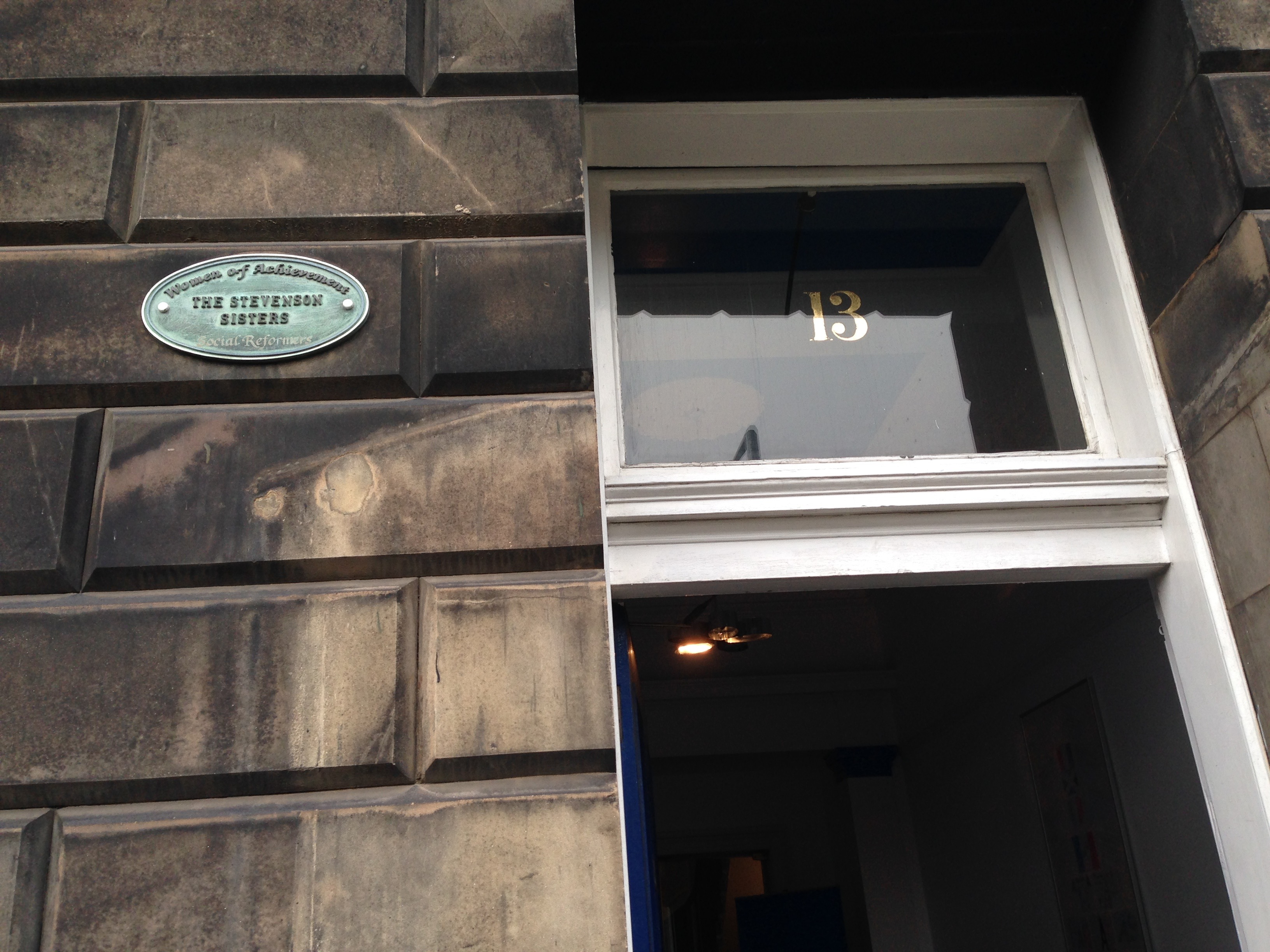
Plaque at 13 Randolph Crescent, Edinburgh, home of Flora and Louisa Stevenson, Scottish campaigners for women's rights

Stevenson was born at Glasgow, the daughter of Jane Stewart Shannan, daughter of Alexander Shannan, a merchant of Greenock and James Stevenson (1786–1866), a merchant of Glasgow. Louisa was one of a large family including her fellow-campaigner and sister Flora, the architect John James Stevenson, and MP James Cochran Stevenson. The family moved to Jarrow in 1844 when James Stevenson became partner in a chemical works. After he retired in 1854 the family moved to Edinburgh shortly before Mrs Stevenson died, and in 1859 they settled in a house in Randolph Crescent, where they spent the rest of their lives. Louisa, Flora, Elisa Stevenson (1829–1904), an early suffragist, and founding member of the Edinburgh National Society for Women's Suffrage, which Louisa and Flora also joined, but sister Jane Stevenson (1828–1904), although a strong influence within the family but did not participate in her sisters' activities beyond the home and Eliza was said to be of delicate health. After their father died leaving them comfortably off the Misses Stevenson were able to contribute financially to various causes.

== Education and nursing ==
Louisa Stevenson was a member and honorary secretary of the Edinburgh Ladies' Educational Association (which later became the Edinburgh Association for the University Education of Women or EAUEW) and in 1868 she and Flora attended the first course of lectures for women given by Professor David Masson. This was the time when Sophia Jex-Blake was starting her campaign to open up medical education to women and Stevenson was honorary treasurer of a committee formed to support Jex-Blake and help with her legal costs. She and Flora paid for their niece Alice Stewart Ker to study medicine in Bern for a year. Alice was to become the 13th female British doctor.

Stevenson's role in the EAUEW led to her giving evidence to a Commission on University Education, so contributing to the Universities (Scotland) Act 1889 which meant that Scottish universities were open to women students from 1892. This led to fund-raising for a women's hall of residence at the University of Edinburgh, the Masson Hall, which opened in 1897 with Louisa Stevenson as honorary secretary.

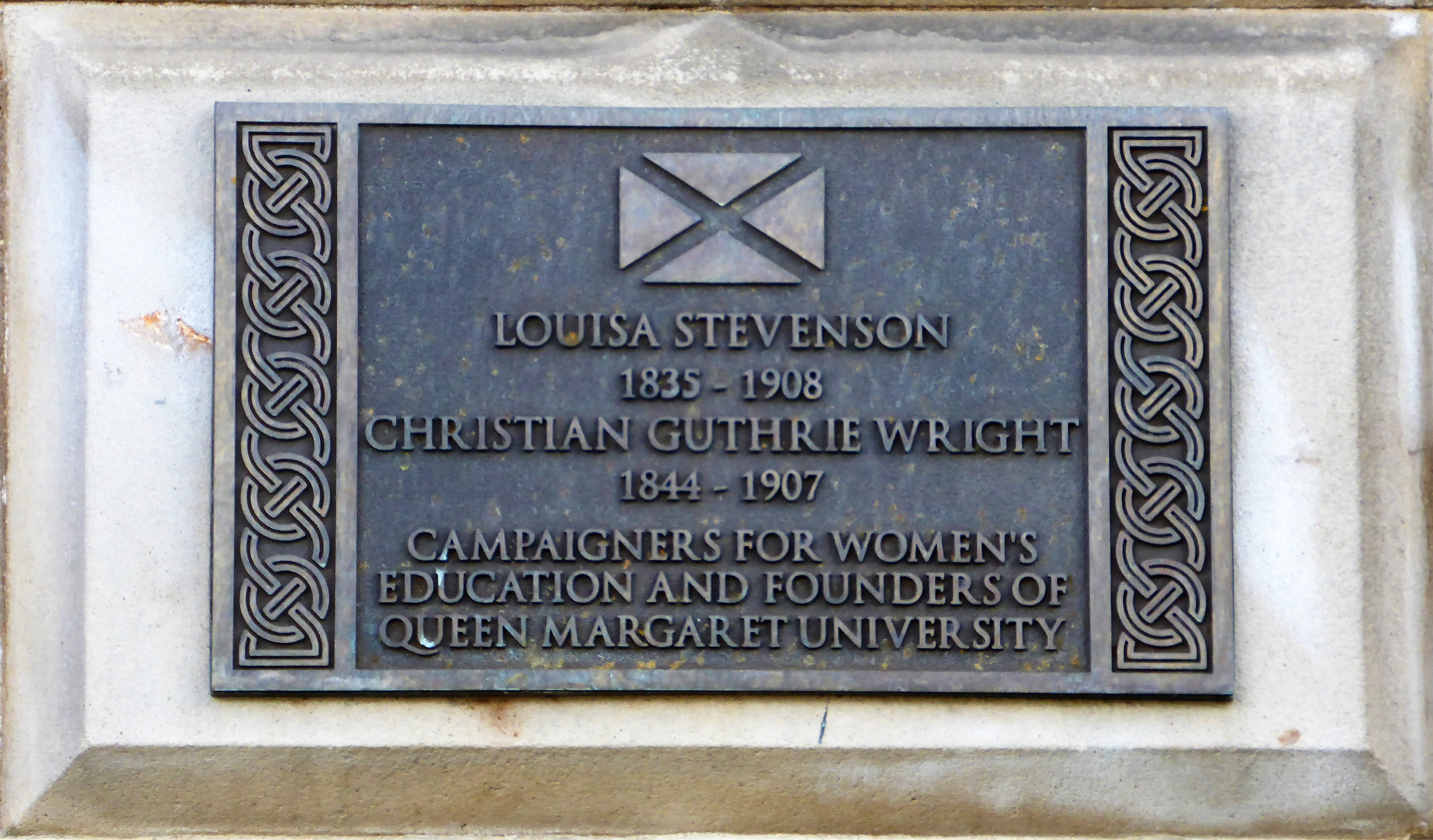
Plaque to Louisa Stevenson and Christian Guthrie Wright at 5 Atholl Crescent, Edinburgh

She also contributed to education by co-founding the Edinburgh School of Cookery at Atholl Crescent, with Christian Edington Guthrie Wright. The school under Ethel Maud De la Cour was to define Domestic Science teaching in Scotland. The Edinburgh School was a forerunner of Queen Margaret University.

Stevenson took a particular interest in the standard of nursing at the poorhouse in her position as the first female poor law guardian in the city. She helped manage the Jubilee Nurses Institute (for District Nurses) and the Colonial Nursing Organisation (nurses needed in various parts of the British Empire), and was also president of the Society for the State Registration of Trained Nurses.

== Other interests ==
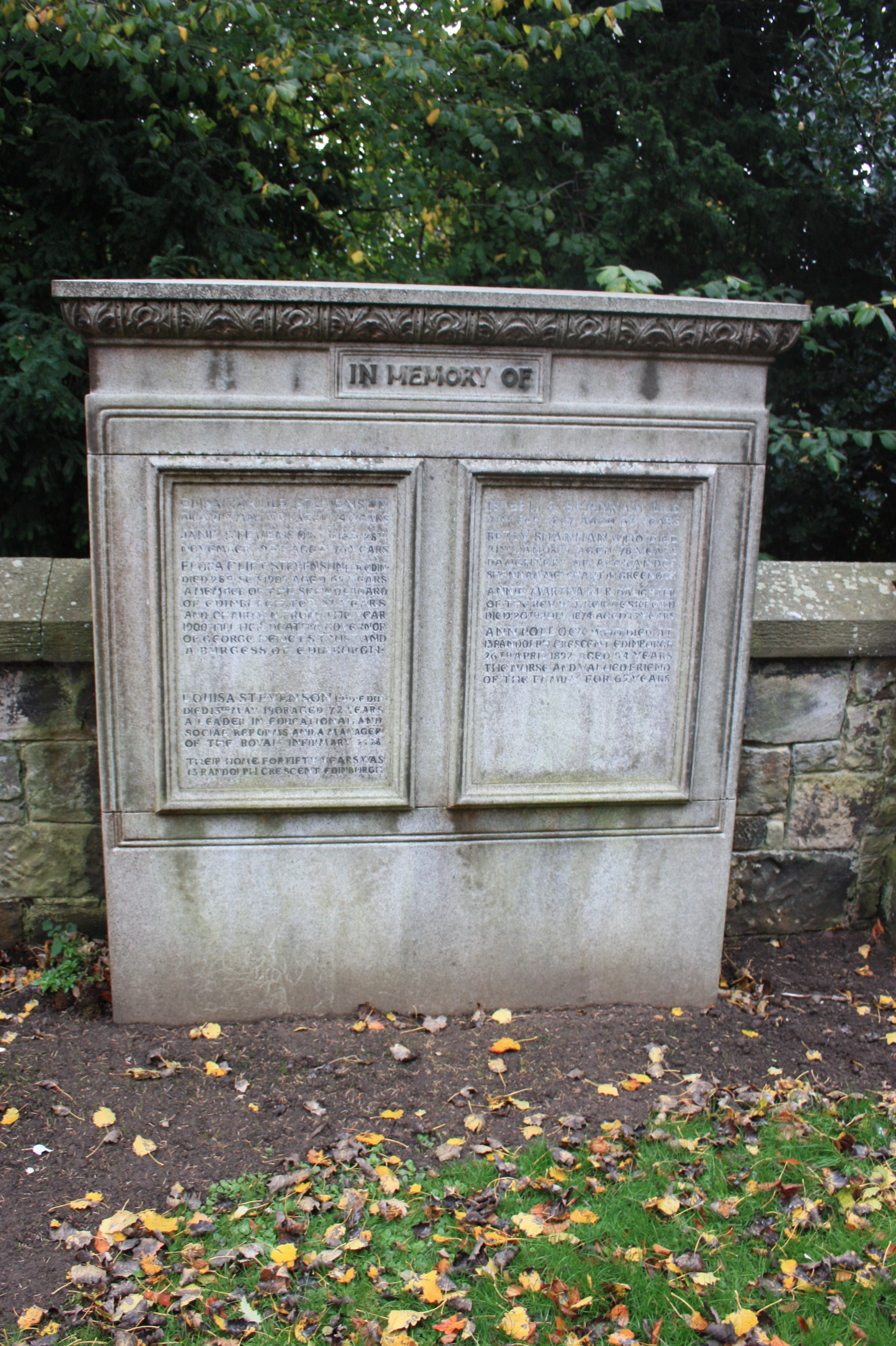
The grave of Louisa and Flora Stevenson, Dean Cemetery, Edinburgh

While her sister Flora was one of the first women ever to serve on a school board, Louisa was one of the first women elected to a hospital board (and re-elected six times), and her work was so valuable that she changed the attitude of one male board member who had at first been opposed to the idea of a woman helping to run the Edinburgh Royal Infirmary. She believed that women's qualifications for helping with hospital management were equal to men's though each sex might bring somewhat different experience to the task. And she was also one of the first (of two) women elected to the city's parochial board (later parish council) which she served upon for ten years.

All her life, Louisa Stevenson supported the cause of women's suffrage and she was an executive committee member of the National Union of Women's Suffrage Societies in the 1890s. In the last years of her life, she met Prime Minister Henry Campbell-Bannerman as part of a deputation of women's suffragists, and in that same year, 1906, she received an honorary degree of LLD from the University of Edinburgh.

She died on 13 May 1908, at home in Edinburgh. She is buried with her sisters in Dean Cemetery in western Edinburgh. The grave lies on the southern wall above the south terrace.

The British Journal of Nursing attributed her success in everything she did to her "genial courtesy", "indomitable perseverance" and a "thorough grasp of the subject in hand".

== Sources ==
- Oxford Dictionary of National Biography
- "Miss Louisa Stevenson, President of the Society for the State Registration of Trained Nurses" (PDF). British Journal of Nursing: 8. 5 July 1902.
- Scotsman obituary, 14 May 1908
