= Colin Hunter =

Scottish artist

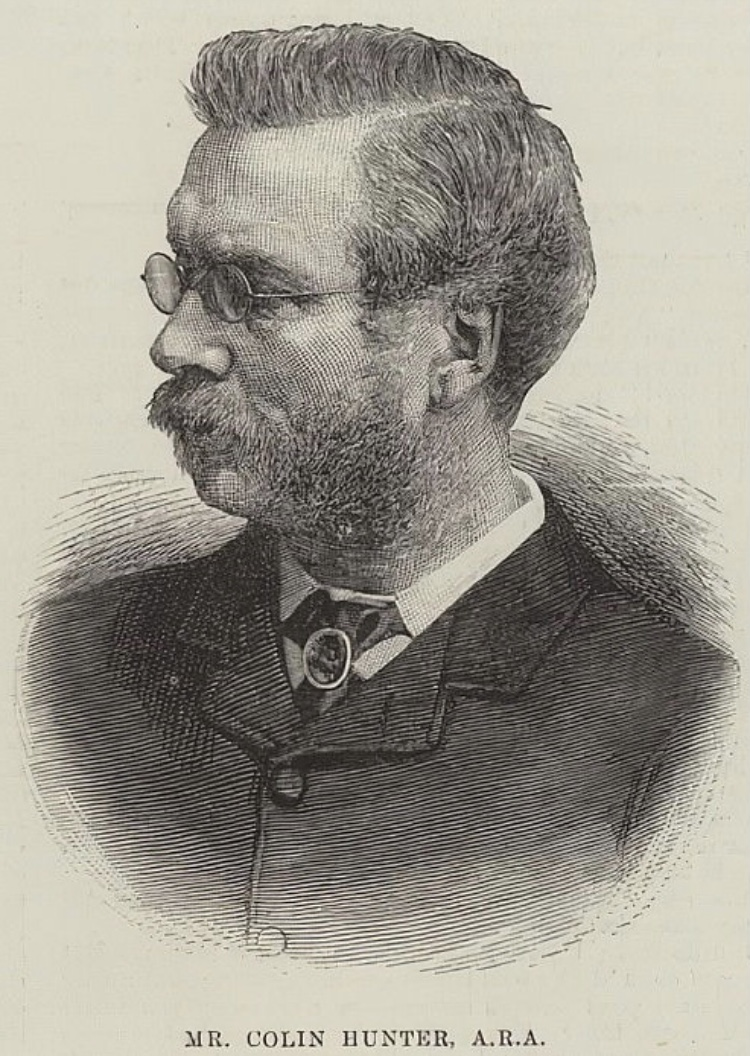
Colin Hunter, pictured in 1884

Colin Hunter ARA (1841 – 24 September 1904) was a Scottish artist of the Victorian era. Most of his works are seascapes.

== Early life ==
Hunter was born in Glasgow, Scotland, in 1841. About 1844, his father moved the family to Helensburgh, on the coast of the Firth of Clyde, where he opened a bookshop and was also post-master. In his youth Hunter spent most of his spare time sketching from nature, and on leaving school he became a clerk in a shipping office in Glasgow, where he stayed for four years. There he met and befriended William Black, a journalist who later became a novelist, and began to study at a local art school, often working out of doors with Milne Donald, a painter who taught him landscape painting.

== Career ==
At the age of twenty, Hunter left his clerical job to become a painter. Some time later, he spent some months in the studio of Leon Bonnat in Paris, but this did not change his style. Some of Hunter's early work was exhibited in the Glasgow Institute of Fine Art and the Royal Scottish Academy.

In 1868, Hunter presented his first notable painting, Taking in the nets, at the Royal Academy in London. He became an Associate Member of the Royal Academy in 1884 and exhibited nearly one hundred paintings in the Universal Exhibitions in Berlin, Vienna, and Philadelphia between 1886 and 1891.

Although he returned to Scotland to paint nearly every year, from 1876 Hunter lived in Melbury Road, Kensington, on the west side of Holland Park. His house and studio was huge and he kept company with other celebrated artists. Melbury Road and its adjacent streets became an enclave of successful artists in the last quarter of the 19th century - most of whom were Academicians. Hunter’s artist friends and neighbours included Lord Leighton, George Frederic Watts, and Luke Fildes.

He was predominantly a painter of seascapes and working fisher-folk on the shore in fishing villages up and down the Scottish coast, but he also painted in Ireland, Cornwall, and Devon, and travelled to New York, where he painted the Niagara Falls.

== Personal life ==
On 20 November 1873, in Glasgow, Hunter married Isabella Young, daughter of John H. Young, surgeon-dentist. They had two daughters and two sons. His son John Young Hunter, and his son’s wife, Mary, were also artists.

Hunter died in September 1904, at Lugar House, 14 Melbury Road, Kensington, leaving a substantial estate valued at £11,400, equivalent to £1,198,450 in 2025.
