= Jim Stevenson (footballer, born 1881) =

Scottish footballer

Personal information
- Date of birth: 2 February 1881
- Date of death: 1946 (aged 64–65)
- Position: Inside forward

Senior career*
Years	Team	Apps	(Gls)
1900–1902	Morton	23	(7)
1902–1903	Nottingham Forest	6	(0)
1903–1904	New Brompton		
1904–1907	Morton	9	(0)
1905–1906	→ Abercorn (loan)	3	(0)
1907	→ Port Glasgow Athletic (loan)	1	(0)
- * Club domestic league appearances and goals

James Stevenson (2 February 1881 – 1946) was a Scottish footballer who played as an inside forward and was active in the early 20th century. He made six appearances in The Football League for Nottingham Forest and also played for Gillingham. In Scotland he had two spells with Morton, the second of which included loans to Abercorn and Port Glasgow Athletic.
