= James Stevenson (cricketer) =

Scottish cricketer

Personal information
- Full name: James Alexander Stevenson
- Born: 24 June 1915; Edinburgh, Midlothian, Scotland
- Died: 5 September 1993 (aged 78); Gullane, East Lothian, Scotland
- Batting: Right-handed
- Bowling: Right-arm medium

Domestic team information
- Years: Team
- 1937–1951: Scotland

Career statistics
Competition	First-class
Matches	4
Runs scored	127
Batting average	21.16
100s/50s	–/–
Top score	45*
Catches/stumpings	2/–
- Source: Cricinfo, 21 July 2022

James Alexander Stevenson (24 June 1915 — 5 September 1993) was a Scottish first-class cricketer.

Stevenson was born in June 1915 at Edinburgh, where he was educated at the Edinburgh Academy. A club cricketer for Edinburgh Academical Cricket Club, he made his debut for Scotland against Ireland at Belfast in 1937. Prior to the Second World War, he made two further first-class appearances, against Yorkshire at Harrogate on Scotland's 1937 tour of England, and against Ireland at Glasgow in 1938. He served in the British Army during the war, playing in a minor match for the British Army cricket team against a combined Royal Air Force and Royal Navy side in 1941. Following the war, he made a fourth and final first-class appearance for Scotland against Yorkshire at Scarborough in 1951. Playing as a batsman in the Scottish side, Stevenson scored 127 runs at an average of 21.16, with a highest score of 45 not out. Outside of cricket, he was a stockbroker by profession. Stevenson died in September 1993 at Gullane, East Lothian.
