= Sir Kenneth Anderson, 1st Baronet =

Anderson baronets
- Escutcheon of the Anderson baronets of Ardtaraig
- Creation date: 1919
- Status: extinct
- Extinction date: 1942

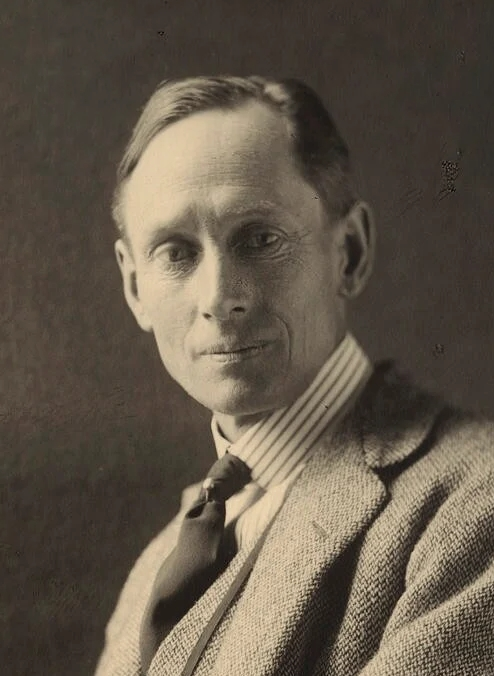
Portrait by Olive Edis (c. 1920)

Sir Kenneth Skelton Anderson, 1st Baronet, KCMG (21 December 1866 – 9 December 1942), was a British shipowner and public servant. He was a manager of the Orient Steam Navigation Company and a director of Anderson, Green & Co., shipowners.

Anderson was educated at Harrow School. He matriculated at New College, Oxford, in 1885. He followed his father into the family business after his graduation.

During the First World War, he served in numerous committees related to shipping, and was a close associate of the Shipping Controller, Sir Joseph Maclay.

Anderson was created a KCMG in 1909 and a baronet, of Ardtaraig in the County of Perth, in 1919. He was also a Commander of the Order of the Crown of Italy.
