= Alfred Marshall =

British economist (1842–1924)

Alfred Marshall FBA
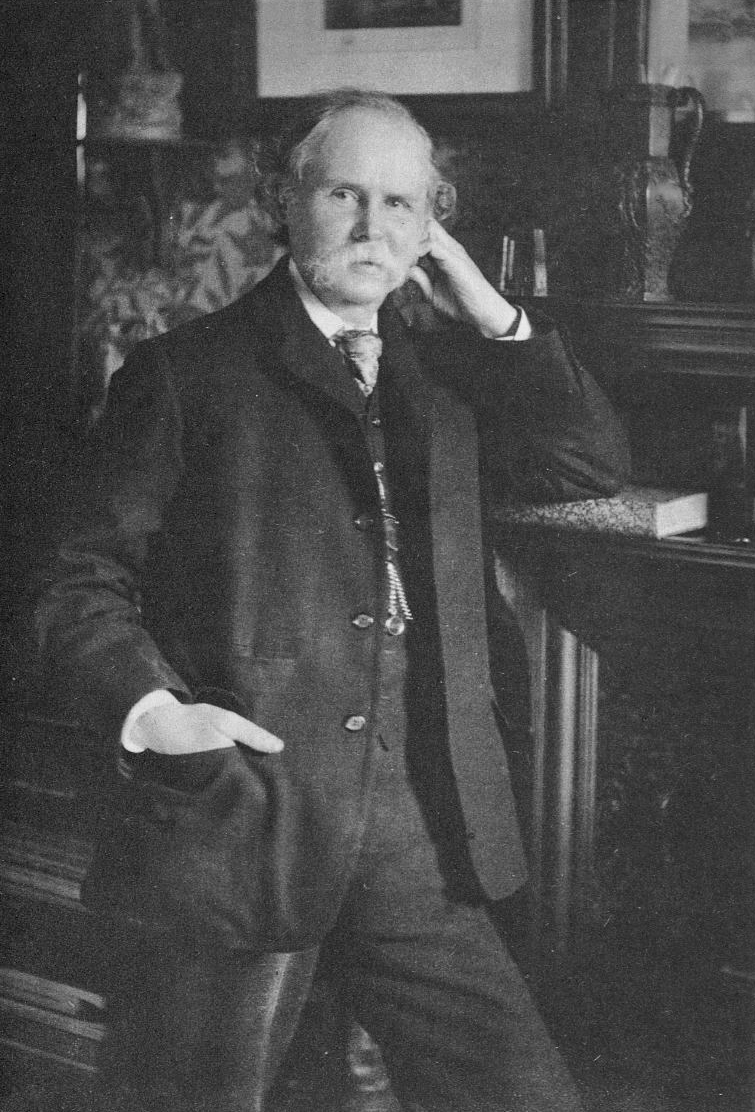
- Marshall, c. the release of Principles (1890)
- Born: 26 July 1842; London, England
- Died: 13 July 1924 (aged 81); Cambridge, England
- Spouse: Mary Paley Marshall (m. 1877)

Academic background
- Education: St John's College, Cambridge
- Influences: Carlyle; Dupuit; Jevons; Pareto; Ruskin; Sidgwick; Walras

Academic work
- School or tradition: Neoclassical economics
- Institutions: St John's College, Cambridge; University College, Bristol; Balliol College, Oxford
- Notable ideas: Father of microeconomics and welfare economics; Founder of neoclassical economics; Principles of Economics (1890); Marshallian scissors; Internal and external economies; Marshall–Lerner condition

Alfred Marshall (26 July 1842 – 13 July 1924) was an English economist and one of the most influential economists of his time. His book Principles of Economics (1890) was the dominant economic textbook in England for many years, and brought the ideas of supply and demand, marginal utility, and costs of production into a coherent whole, popularizing the modern neoclassical approach which dominates microeconomics to this day. As a result, he is known as the father of scientific economics.

== Early life ==
Marshall was born at Bermondsey in London, the second son of William Marshall (1812–1901), a clerk and cashier at the Bank of England, and Rebecca (1817–1878), daughter of butcher Thomas Oliver, from whom, on her mother's death, she inherited property. Marshall had two brothers and two sisters; a cousin was the economist Ralph Hawtrey. The Marshalls were a West Country clerical family; Marshall's great-great-grandfather was "the Reverend William Marshall, half-legendary Herculean parson of Devonshire", famous for "twisting horseshoes with his hands" to scare "local blacksmiths into fearing that they blew their bellows for the devil". William Marshall was a devout strict Evangelical, "author of an Evangelical epic in a sort of Anglo-Saxon language of his own invention which found some favour in its appropriate circles" and of a tract titled Men's Rights and Women's Duties. Some scholars note this strict upbringing strongly influenced Marshall's work, citing the influence of philosophical idealism.

Marshall grew up in Clapham and was educated at the Merchant Taylors' School and St John's College, Cambridge, where he demonstrated an aptitude in mathematics, achieving the rank of Second Wrangler in the 1865 Cambridge Mathematical Triposlib. Marshall experienced a mental crisis that led him to abandon physics and switch to philosophy. He began with metaphysics, specifically "the philosophical foundation of knowledge, especially in relation to theology". Metaphysics led Marshall to ethics, specifically a Sidgwickian version of utilitarianism; ethics, in turn, led him to economics, because economics played an essential role in providing the preconditions for the improvement of the working class. He saw that the duty of economics was to improve material conditions, but such improvement would occur, Marshall believed, only in connection with social and political forces. His interest in Georgism, liberalism, socialism, trade unions, women's education, poverty and economic progress reflect the influence of his early social philosophy on his later activities and writings.

== Career ==
Marshall was elected in 1865 to a fellowship at St John's College at Cambridge, and became lecturer in the moral sciences in 1868. He taught Mary Paley who became a lecturer at the then embryonic Newnham College, Cambridge; their marriage in 1877 obliged Marshall to resign his position as a Fellow of St John's College, Cambridge. This coincided with his appointment as the first principal at University College, Bristol, which later became the University of Bristol, where he lectured on political economy and economics, alongside his wife, until he resigned in 1881. He returned as Professor of Political Economy in 1882, leaving Bristol for good in 1883 when he was appointed a tutorial fellow at Balliol College, University of Oxford. In 1885 he was appointed professor of political economy at Cambridge University, where he remained until his retirement in 1908. Over the years he interacted with many British thinkers including Henry Sidgwick, W. K. Clifford, Benjamin Jowett, William Stanley Jevons, Francis Ysidro Edgeworth, John Neville Keynes and John Maynard Keynes. Marshall founded the Cambridge School which paid special attention to increasing returns, the theory of the firm, and welfare economics; after his retirement academic leadership of the Cambridge economists was taken up by Arthur Cecil Pigou and John Maynard Keynes.

== Contributions to economics ==
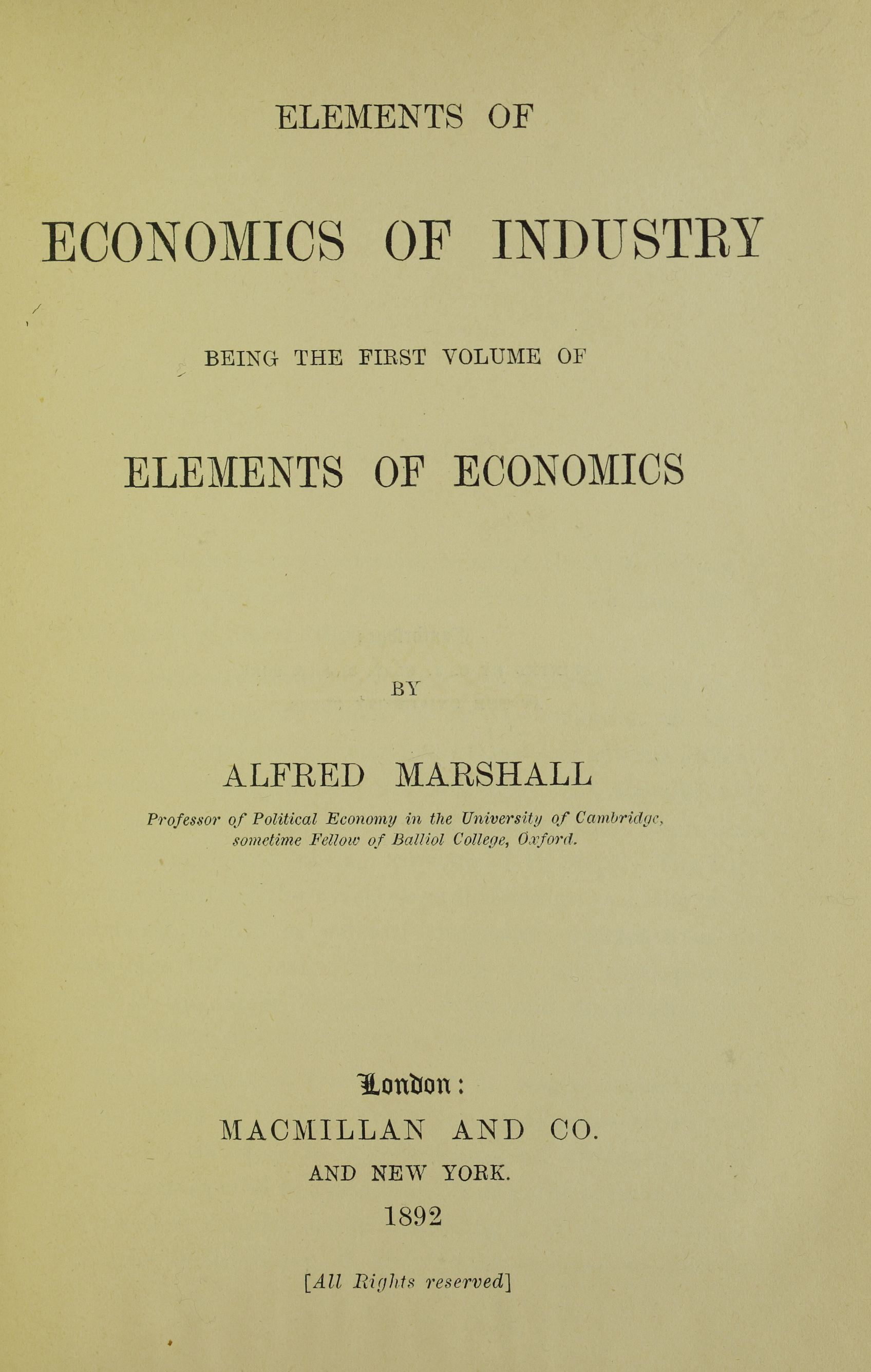
Elements of Economics of Industry, 1892

Marshall desired to improve the mathematical rigour of economics and transform it into a more scientific profession. In the 1870s he wrote a small number of tracts on international trade and the problems of protectionism. In 1879, many of these works were compiled into a work entitled The Theory of Foreign Trade: The Pure Theory of Domestic Values. In the same year (1879) he published The Economics of Industry with his wife Mary Paley Marshall.

Although Marshall took economics to a more mathematically rigorous level, he did not want mathematics to overshadow economics and thus make it irrelevant to the layman. Accordingly, Marshall tailored the text of his books to laymen and put the mathematical content in the footnotes and appendices for the professionals. In a letter to A. L. Bowley, he laid out the following system:

(1) Use mathematics as shorthand language, rather than as an engine of inquiry. (2) Keep to them till you have done. (3) Translate into English. (4) Then illustrate by examples that are important in real life (5) Burn the mathematics. (6) If you can't succeed in 4, burn 3. This I do often."

Together, he and his wife completed Economics of Industry while at Bristol, and after publication it was adopted widely in England as an economic curriculum; its simple form stood upon sophisticated theoretical foundations. Marshall achieved a measure of fame from this work, and upon the death of William Jevons in 1882, Marshall became the leading British economist of the scientific school of his time.

Marshall returned to Cambridge as Professor of Political Economy in 1884 on the death of Henry Fawcett. At Cambridge he endeavoured to create a new tripos for economics, a goal which he would achieve only in 1903. Until that time, economics was taught under the Historical and Moral Sciences Triposes which failed to provide Marshall the kind of energetic and specialised students he desired.

Along with Pigou and Hawtrey, Marshall developed the quantity theory of money or the income version of the money theory. In 1917, Marshall introduced the Cambridge version of the quantity theory of money and this was refined further by Pigou, Hawtrey, and Robertson. It became known as the Cambridge equation.

=== Principles of Economics (1890) ===
Marshall began his economic work, the Principles of Economics, in 1881, and spent much of the next decade at work on the treatise. His plan for the work gradually extended to a two-volume compilation on the whole of economic thought. The first volume was published in 1890 to worldwide acclaim, establishing him as one of the leading economists of his time. The second volume, which was to address foreign trade, money, trade fluctuations, taxation, and collectivism, was never published.

Principles of Economics established his worldwide reputation. It appeared in eight editions, starting at 750 pages and growing to 870 pages. It decisively shaped the teaching of economics in English-speaking countries. Its main technical contribution was a masterful analysis of the issues of elasticity, consumer surplus, increasing and diminishing returns, short and long terms, and marginal utility. Many of the ideas were original with Marshall; others were improved versions of the ideas by W. S. Jevons and others.

In a broader sense Marshall hoped to reconcile the classical and modern theories of value. John Stuart Mill had examined the relationship between the value of commodities and their production costs, on the theory that value depends on the effort expended in manufacture. Jevons and the marginal utility theorists had elaborated a theory of value based on the idea of maximising utility, holding that value depends on demand. Marshall's work used both these approaches, but he focused more on costs. He noted that, in the short run, supply cannot be changed and market value depends mainly on demand. In an intermediate time period, production can be expanded by existing facilities, such as buildings and machinery, but, since these do not require renewal within this intermediate period, their costs (called fixed, overhead, or supplementary costs) have little influence on the sale price of the product. Marshall pointed out that it is the prime or variable costs, which constantly recur, that influence the sale price most in this period. In a still longer period, machines and buildings wear out and have to be replaced, so that the sale price of the product must be high enough to cover such replacement costs. This classification of costs into fixed and variable and the emphasis given to the element of time probably represent one of Marshall's chief contributions to economic theory. He was committed to partial equilibrium models over general equilibrium on the grounds that the inherently dynamical nature of economics made the former more practically useful.

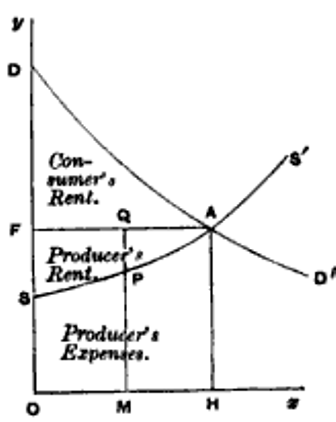
Alfred Marshall's supply and demand graph.

Much of the success of Marshall's teaching and Principles book derived from his effective use of diagrams, which were soon emulated by other teachers worldwide.

Alfred Marshall was the first to develop the standard supply and demand graph demonstrating a number of fundamentals regarding supply and demand including the supply and demand curves, market equilibrium, the relationship between quantity and price in regards to supply and demand, the law of marginal utility, the law of diminishing returns, and the ideas of consumer and producer surpluses. This model is now used by economists in various forms using different variables to demonstrate several other economic principles. Marshall's model allowed a visual representation of complex economic fundamentals where before all the ideas and theories were only capable of being explained through words. These models are now critical throughout the study of economics because they allow a clear and concise representation of the fundamentals or theories being explained.

=== Theoretical contributions ===
Marshall is considered to be one of the most influential economists of his time, largely shaping mainstream economic thought for the next fifty years, and being one of the founders of the school of neoclassical economics. Although his economics was advertised as extensions and refinements of the work of Adam Smith, Thomas Robert Malthus and John Stuart Mill, he extended economics away from its classical focus on the market economy and instead popularised it as a study of human behaviour. He downplayed the contributions of certain other economists to his work, such as Léon Walras, Vilfredo Pareto and Jules Dupuit, and only grudgingly acknowledged the influence of Stanley Jevons himself.

Marshall was one of those who used utility analysis, but not as a theory of value. He used it as a part of the theory to explain demand curves and the principle of substitution. Marshall's scissors analysis – which combined demand and supply, that is, utility and cost of production, as if in the two blades of a pair of scissors – effectively removed the theory of value from the center of analysis and replaced it with the theory of price. While the term "value" continued to be used, for most people it was a synonym for "price". Prices no longer were thought to gravitate toward some ultimate and absolute basis of price; prices were existential, between the relationship of demand and supply.

Marshall's influence on codifying economic thought is difficult to deny. He popularised the use of supply and demand functions as tools of price determination (previously discovered independently by Cournot); modern economists owe the linkage between price shifts and curve shifts to Marshall. Marshall was an important part of the "marginalist revolution"; the idea that consumers attempt to adjust consumption until marginal utility equals the price was another of his contributions. The price elasticity of demand was presented by Marshall as an extension of these ideas. Economic welfare, divided into producer surplus and consumer surplus, was contributed by Marshall, and indeed, the two are sometimes described eponymously as 'Marshallian surplus.' He used this idea of surplus to rigorously analyse the effect of taxes and price shifts on market welfare. Marshall also identified quasi-rents.

Marshall's brief references to the social and cultural relations in the "industrial districts" of England were used as a starting point for late twentieth-century work in economic geography and institutional economics on clustering and learning organisations.

Gary Becker (1930–2014), the 1992 Nobel prize winner in economics, has mentioned that Milton Friedman and Alfred Marshall were the two greatest influences on his work.

Another contribution that Marshall made was differentiating concepts of internal and external economies of scale. That is that when costs of input factors of production go down, it is a positive externality for all the firms in the market place, outside the control of any of the firms.

=== The Marshallian industrial district ===
A concept based on a pattern of organisation that was common in late nineteenth-century Britain in which firms concentrating on the manufacture of certain products were geographically clustered. Comments made by Marshall in Book 4, Chapter 10 of Principles of Economics have been used by economists and economic geographers to discuss this phenomenon.

The two dominant characteristics of a Marshallian industrial district are high degrees of vertical and horizontal specialisation and a very heavy reliance on market mechanism for exchange. Firms tend to be small and to focus on a single function in the production chain. Firms located in industrial districts are highly competitive in the neoclassical sense, and in many cases there is little product differentiation. The major advantages of Marshallian industrial districts arise from simple proximity of firms, which allows easier recruitment of skilled labour and rapid exchanges of commercial and technical information through informal channels. They illustrate competitive capitalism at its most efficient, with transaction costs reduced to a practical minimum, but they are feasible only when economies of scale are limited.

== Later career ==
Marshall served as president of the first day of the 1889 Co-operative Congress.

Over the next two decades he worked to complete the second volume of his Principles, but his unyielding attention to detail and ambition for completeness prevented him from mastering the work's breadth. The work was never finished and many other, lesser works he had begun work on – a memorandum on trade policy for the Chancellor of the Exchequer in the 1890s, for instance – were left incomplete for the same reasons.

His health problems had gradually grown worse since the 1880s, and in 1908 he retired from the university. He hoped to continue work on his Principles but his health continued to deteriorate and the project had continued to grow with each further investigation. The outbreak of the First World War in 1914 prompted him to revise his examinations of the international economy and in 1919 he published Industry and Trade at the age of 77. This work was a more empirical treatise than the largely theoretical Principles, and for that reason it failed to attract as much acclaim from theoretical economists. In 1923, he published Money, Credit, and Commerce, a broad amalgam of previous economic ideas, published and unpublished, stretching back a half-century.

== Final years, death and legacy ==
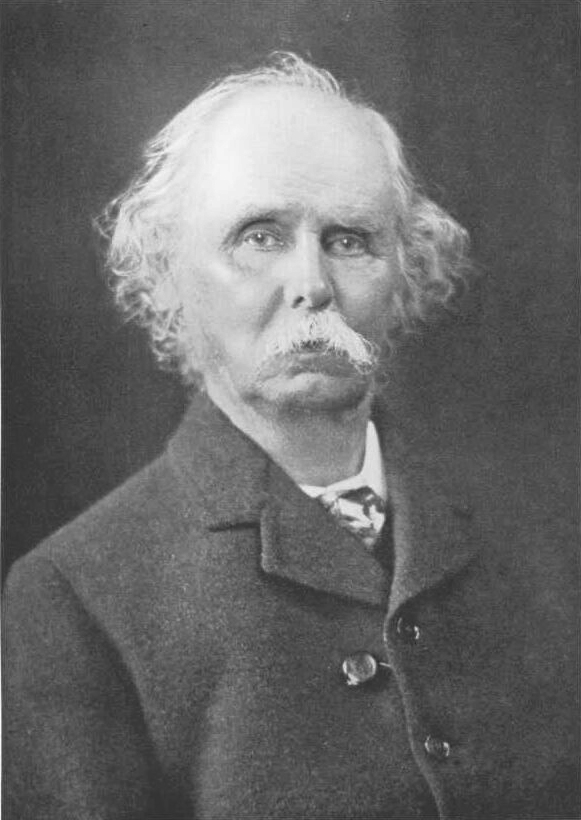
Marshall, age 79, as seen in Keynes' obituary

In 1892, he was elected as an honorary member of the Manchester Literary and Philosophical Society,

He had shied away from controversy during his life in a way that previous leaders of the profession had not, although his even-handedness drew great respect and even reverence from fellow economists, and his home at Balliol Croft in Cambridge had no shortage of distinguished guests. His students at Cambridge became leading figures in economics, including John Maynard Keynes and Arthur Cecil Pigou. His most important legacy was creating a respected, academic, scientifically founded profession for economists in the future that set the tone of the field for the remainder of the 20th century.

Marshall died aged 81 at his home in Cambridge and is buried in the Ascension Parish Burial Ground. Keynes wrote an obituary for his former tutor which Joseph Schumpeter called "the most brilliant life of a man of science I have ever read".

The library of the Department of Economics at Cambridge University (The Marshall Library of Economics), the Economics society at Cambridge (The Marshall Society) as well as the University of Bristol Economics department are named after him. His archive is available for consultation by appointment at the Marshall Library of Economics.

His home, Balliol Croft, was renamed Marshall House in 1991 in his honour when it was bought by Lucy Cavendish College, Cambridge.

Alfred Marshall's wife was Mary Paley, an economist who was one of the first women students at Cambridge and a lecturer at Newnham College. She continued to live in Balliol Croft until her death in 1944; her ashes were scattered in the garden. The couple had no children.

== Works ==
- 1879 – The Economics of Industry (with Mary Paley Marshall)
- 1879 – The Pure Theory of Foreign Trade: The Pure Theory of Domestic Values
- 1890 – Principles of Economics
- 1919 – Industry and Trade
- 1923 – Money, Credit and Commerce

== See also ==
- Welfare definition of economics
- Marshall Jevons, a pseudonym partly derived from Marshall's name
- Liberalism in the United Kingdom
