= James Croesus Stevenson =

Scottish Industrialist & Philanthropist

James "Croesus" Stevenson FRGS FRSE LLD (1822 – 28 January 1903) was a 19th-century Scottish industrialist and philanthropist.

== Life ==
He was born in 1822 at 63 Candleriggs in Glasgow, the son of Nathaniel Stevenson (1787–1867), and his wife, Elizabeth Carlile from Paisley. His father by 1840 had founded Oswald, Stevenson & Co, cotton yarn agents and was living at Provanside on Stirling Road. His partner was James Oswald, and their first premises was at 98 Hutcheson Street.

He was a partner in Oswald Stevenson & Co, cotton yarn agents of 23 Royal Exchange Square. In 1850 James lived at 4 Woodside Crescent in Glasgow.

He worked as a dye manufacturer for the calico and linen industries in Glasgow. Over and above taking over Oswald Stevenson in 1843 he also set up Stevenson Carlile with his cousin, Thomas Carlile.

He is associated with the importation of sulphur to Britain from around 1870 from the volcanic island of Vulcano north of Sicily. At the same time he collected many antiquities from the neighbouring island of Lipari. He visited Vulcano so frequently that he built a house there, in Scots Baronial style, still surviving and known as the "Casa Dell Inglese" (the English house). This association named him the nickname "Croesus", reflecting both his new-found super-wealth, and his Italian links.

By 1870 he was still living at his father's house at 4 Woodside Crescent, but is listed independently as a merchant trading from 23 West Nile Street.

In 1877 he was elected a Fellow of the Royal Society of Edinburgh. His proposers were William Thomson, Lord Kelvin, Alexander Crum Brown, Robert Tennent and John Hutton Balfour. He founded several scholarships in the University of Glasgow, and endowed the chair of Natural Science in the Free Church Theoogical College there. He also paid the cost of a catalogue of the Greek coins in the Hunterian Collection at the university. For this and other services to science and education, the University of Glasgow conferred on him the degree of LL.D..

Stevenson was chairman of the African Lakes Company, and was occasionally consulted as to policy in British Central Africa by Lord Salisbury, Prime Minister or Foreign Minister during much of the 1880s and 1890s. A major road between Lake Nyasa and Tanganyika Territory was once known as Stevenson Road, named after him.

He died at Hailie House, Largs, North Ayrshire, on 28 January 1903. He never married and had no children. He left his large collection of Lipari antiques to the newly completed Kelvingrove Art Gallery and Museum.

== Family ==
His paternal uncle was James Stevenson and his cousins included Flora Stevenson, Louisa Stevenson and John James Stevenson.
