= James Stevenson (merchant) =

Scottish merchant & philanthropist (1786-1866)

James Stevenson FRSE
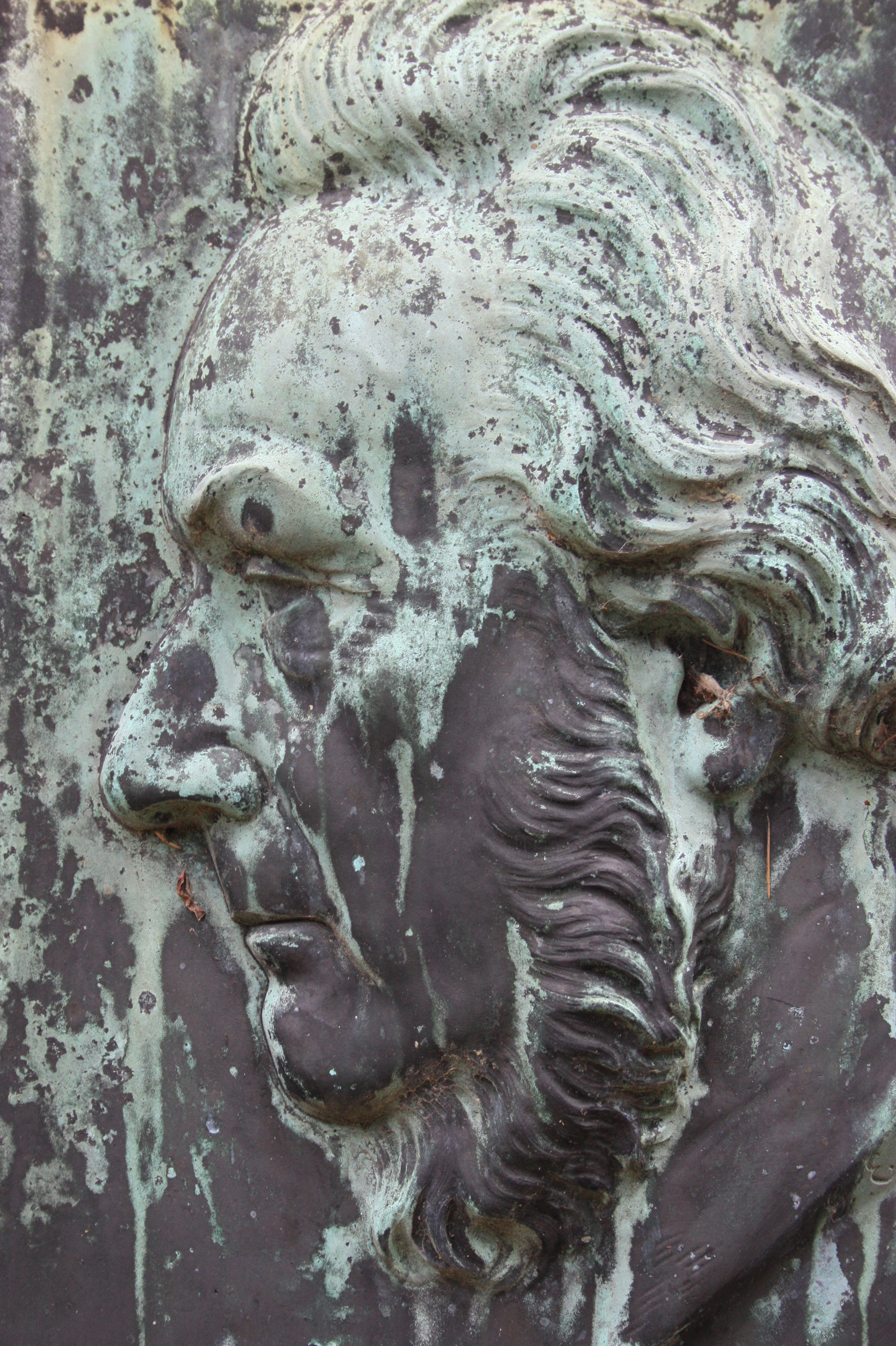
- Plaque on the grave of James Stevenson, Dean Cemetery
- Born: 28 April 1786; Paisley, Scotland
- Died: 13 June 1866 (aged 80); Edinburgh, Scotland
- Education: Paisley Grammar School
- Spouse: Jane Stewart Shannon
- Children: 10
- Parents: James Stevenson (father); Margaret Cochran (mother)
- Relatives: Flora Stevenson (daughter); Louisa Stevenson (daughter); John James Stevenson (son); James Cochran Stevenson (son); James Croesus Stevenson (nephew)

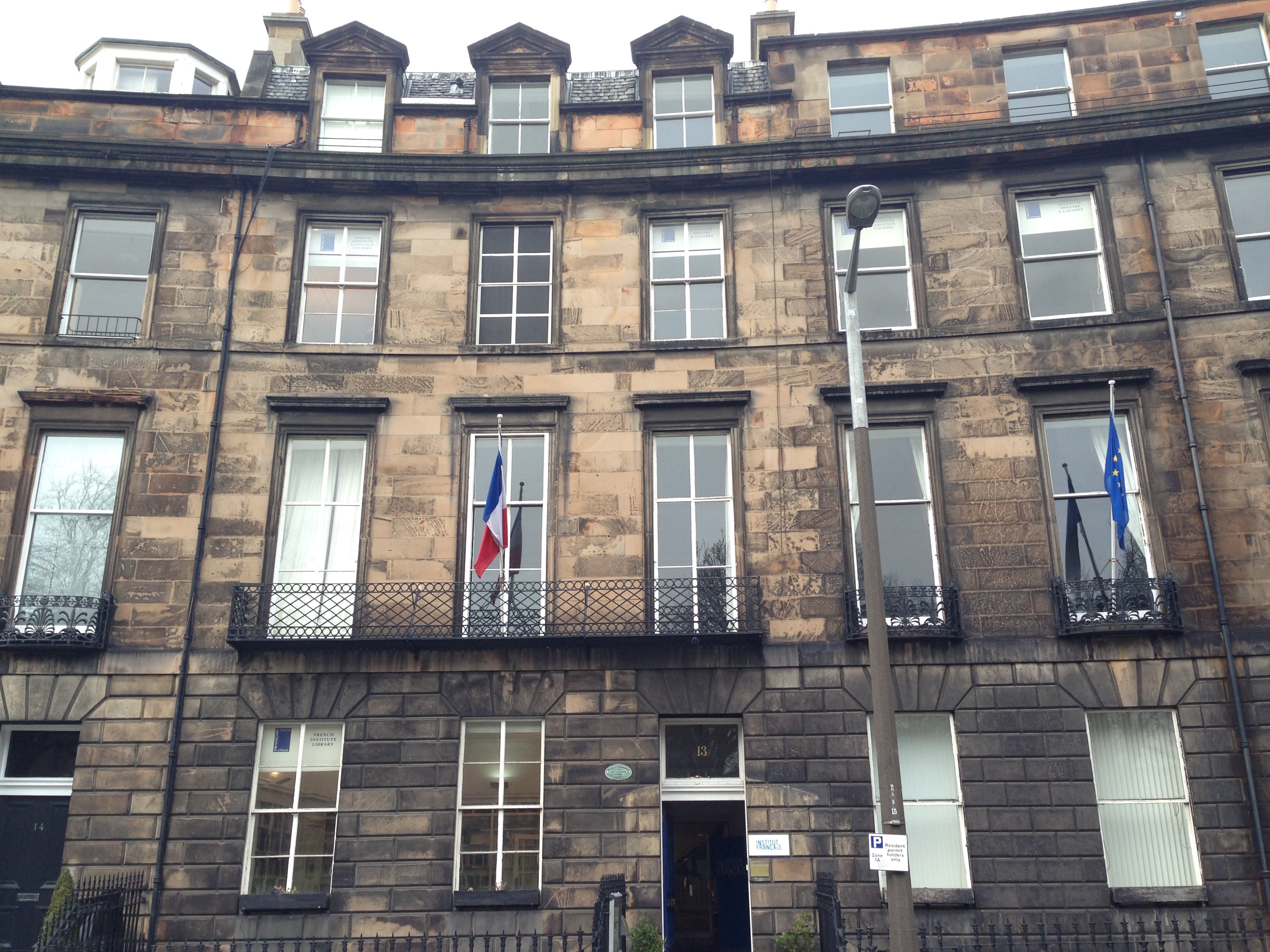
13 Randolph Crescent

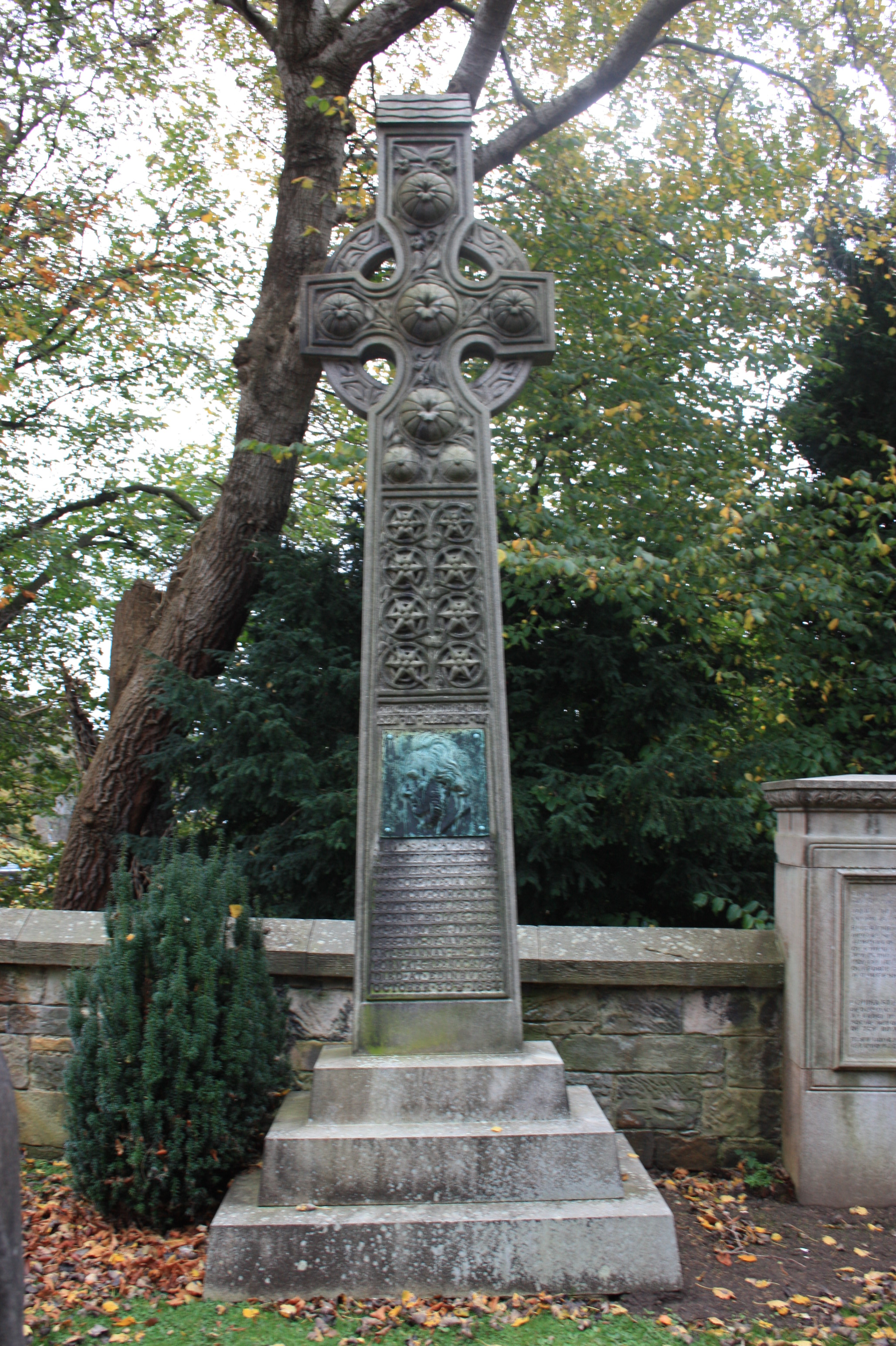
The grave of James Stevenson, Dean Cemetery, Edinburgh

James Stevenson FRSE (1786–1866) was a Scottish merchant and philanthropist who fathered two Scottish heroines, Flora Stevenson and Louisa Stevenson, the industrialist, James Cochran Stevenson and architect John James Stevenson.

== Life ==
He was born in Paisley on 28 April 1786 the son of James Stevenson, a silk gauze manufacturer, and his wife, Margaret Cochran. He was educated at Paisley Grammar School.

He set up a cotton spinning mill with his older brother, Nathaniel Stevenson, first at Calton then Barrowfield, before going into partnership with the Oswald brothers creating Oswald Stevenson & Co with James Oswald.

The family moved into central Glasgow in 1825, running the firm James Stevenson & Co, cotton brokers, from 104 Hutcheson Street. James inherited the family business on his father's death in 1806.

In 1844 he also became a senior partner at the Jarrow Chemical Works in South Shields: a firm supplying dyes for his cottons.

In 1865 he was elected a Fellow of the Royal Society of Edinburgh. His proposer was James Yong.

He died at home, 13 Randolph Crescent in Edinburgh on 13 June 1866.

== Artistic recognition ==
He was portrayed by Norman Macbeth and Thomas Annan photographed the portrait.

== Family ==
He was married to Jane Stewart Shannon from Greenock. They had ten children: four sons and six daughters.

His brother, Nathaniel Stevenson, was father to James Croesus Stevenson.
