= Flora Stevenson =

British suffragist

Flora Stevenson LLD
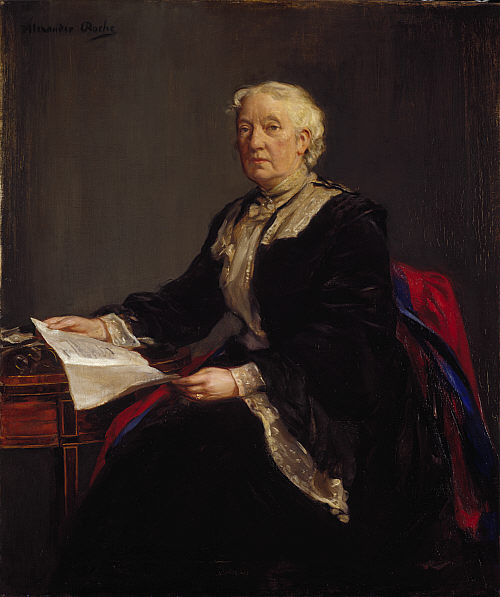
- Flora Stevenson with her red LLD gown, 1904 by Alexander Ignatius Roche
- Born: Flora Clift Stevenson; 30 October 1839; Glasgow, Scotland
- Died: 28 September 1905 (aged 65); St Andrews, Scotland
- Burial place: Dean Cemetery, Edinburgh
- Known for: • Campaigner for women's and girls' education; • One of the first two Scottish women to be elected to a School Board; • Flora Stevenson Primary School, Edinburgh is named for her
- Father: James Stevenson
- Relatives: Louisa Stevenson (sister); John James Stevenson (brother); James Cochran Stevenson (brother); James Croesus Stevenson (cousin)

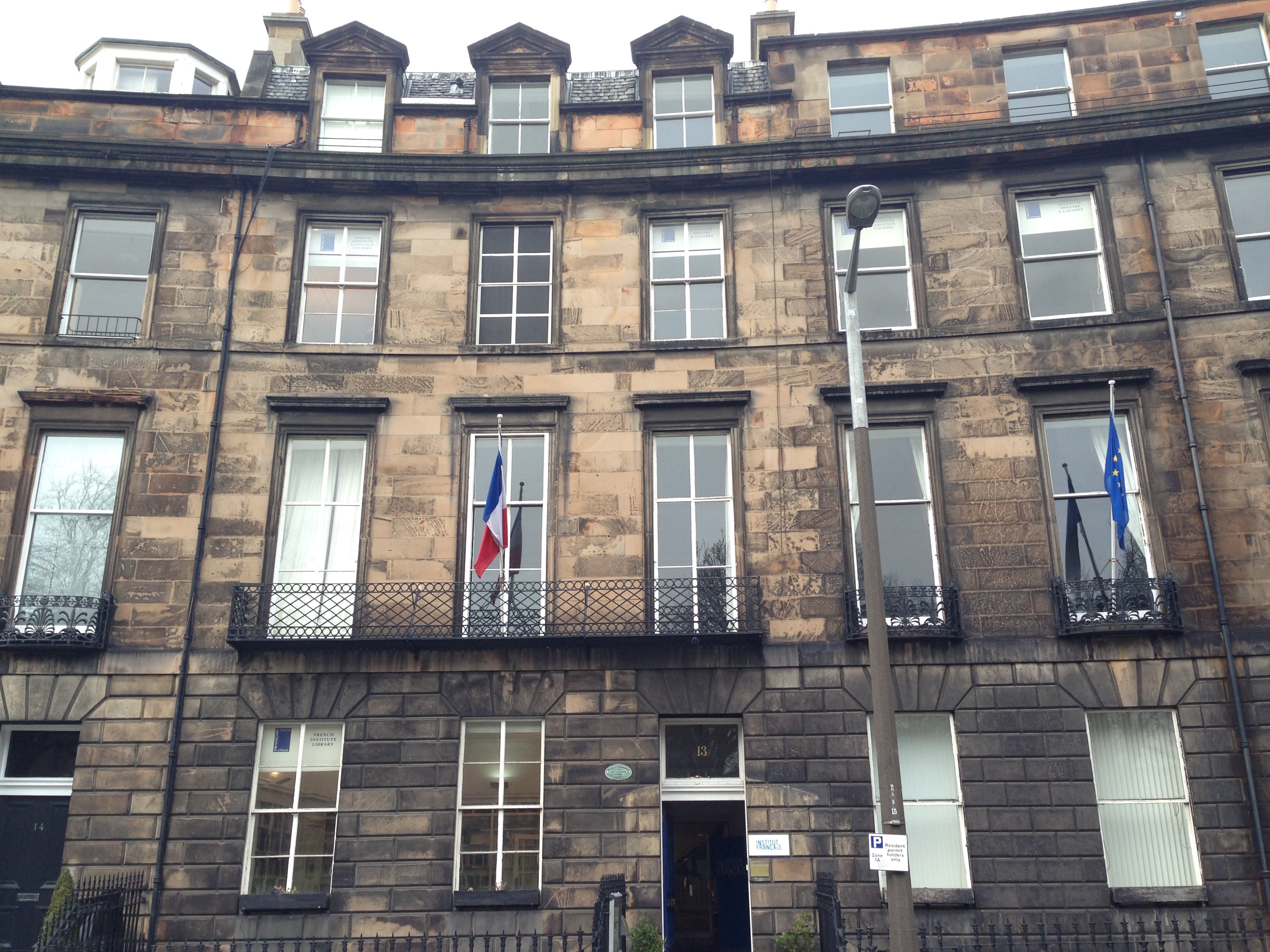
13 Randolph Crescent, Edinburgh

Flora Clift Stevenson (30 October 1839 – 28 September 1905) was a Scottish social reformer with a special interest in education for poor or neglected children, and in education for girls and equal university access for women. She was one of the first women in the United Kingdom to be elected to a school board. (Note: Late 19th century school boards were public bodies with powers to raise funds locally to provide primary education.)

== The first 30 years ==
Flora Clift Stevenson was born in Glasgow, the youngest daughter of Jane Stewart Shannan (daughter of Alexander Shannan, a Greenock merchant) and James Stevenson FRSE (1786–1866), a merchant. Stevenson was one of a large family including her fellow-campaigner and sister Louisa, the architect John James Stevenson, and MP James Cochran Stevenson. The family moved to Jarrow in 1844 when James Stevenson became partner in a chemical works. After he retired, in 1854, the family moved to Edinburgh shortly before Mrs Stevenson died, and in 1859 they settled in a house at 13 Randolph Crescent. Louisa, Flora, Elisa Stevenson (1829–1904), an early suffragist, one of the founders of the Edinburgh National Society for Women's Suffrage, and sister Jane Stevenson (1828–1904) who did not engage in these activities, were to spend the rest of their lives (the house now bears a plaque to "women of achievement").

Her first educational project was an evening literacy class for "messenger girls" in her own home. She was an active member of the Edinburgh Association for Improving the Condition of the Poor, and a committee member of the United Industrial Schools of Edinburgh, organising education in ragged schools for some of the most neglected children of the city.

She and her sister Louisa were involved in the movement to open university education to women, and as members of the Edinburgh Ladies' Educational Association, they were at the first course of lectures for women given by Professor David Masson in 1868.

== School board work and other causes ==
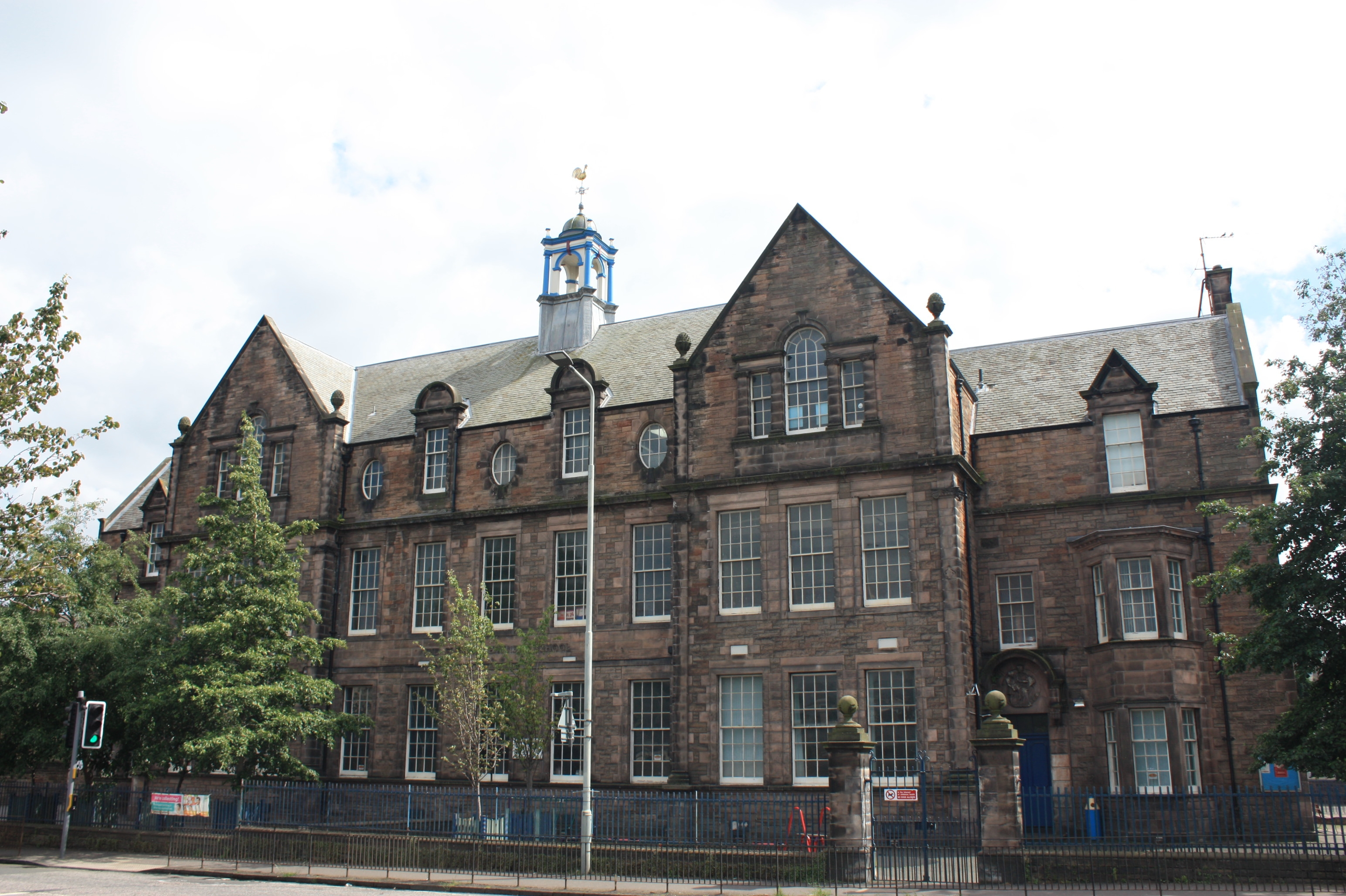
Flora Stevenson School, Comely Bank Edinburgh by John Alexander Carfrae

The Education (Scotland) Act 1872 made it possible for women to serve on school boards. (Note: This had happened two years earlier in England with the Elementary Education Act 1870 (33 & 34 Vict. c. 75).) Stevenson's friend Henry Kingsley had told her that she "was exactly the kind of person" who should have this opportunity. She was one of the first two women to be elected (the other was Phoebe Blyth), and she continued in this role for her whole life, eventually becoming chair of the board. Her experience in working with the poorest children meant that as soon as she was elected she started work on a scheme offering food and clothing in exchange for a commitment to attend school. She was convenor of the attendance committee for many years and gave evidence on this subject to a select committee on education in Scotland in 1887.

She believed strongly in the value of industrial schools for "delinquent" children and her efforts led to the innovative day (non-residential) industrial school at St John's Hill on the fringes of Edinburgh's Old Town. In the 1890s she was involved in plans for the Day Industrial Schools Act 1893, the Scottish Office departmental committee on juvenile delinquents, and a committee advising the Scottish Office on reformatories for inebriates, appointed by Lord Balfour.

Stevenson was a strong supporter of good quality education for girls. She disapproved of girls in Edinburgh schools spending five hours on needlework each week while the boys were having lessons, though she promoted the Edinburgh School of Cookery and Domestic Economy. She told a newspaper, "By all means let the girls of this generation be trained to be good "housemothers" but let it not be forgotten that the well-being of the family depends equally on the "housefather"." She was also a director of the Blind Asylum.

As well as support for women's suffrage, Stevenson's political views included a belief in strongly enforced school attendance, which she felt was the key to improving the lives of deprived children, and opposition to free school meals, which she thought should be the responsibility of parents, supported by charities when necessary. These themes were sometimes addressed in her lectures on educational subjects, which were usually "cordially received". She was a vice-president of the Women's Free Trade Union while tariff reform was a contentious issue, and also of the Women's Liberal Unionist Association.

She was involved with many other social projects and charities. She and Louisa paid for their niece, Alice Stewart Ker, to study medicine in Bern for a year. Alice was to become the 13th female British doctor.

== Honours and her last years ==
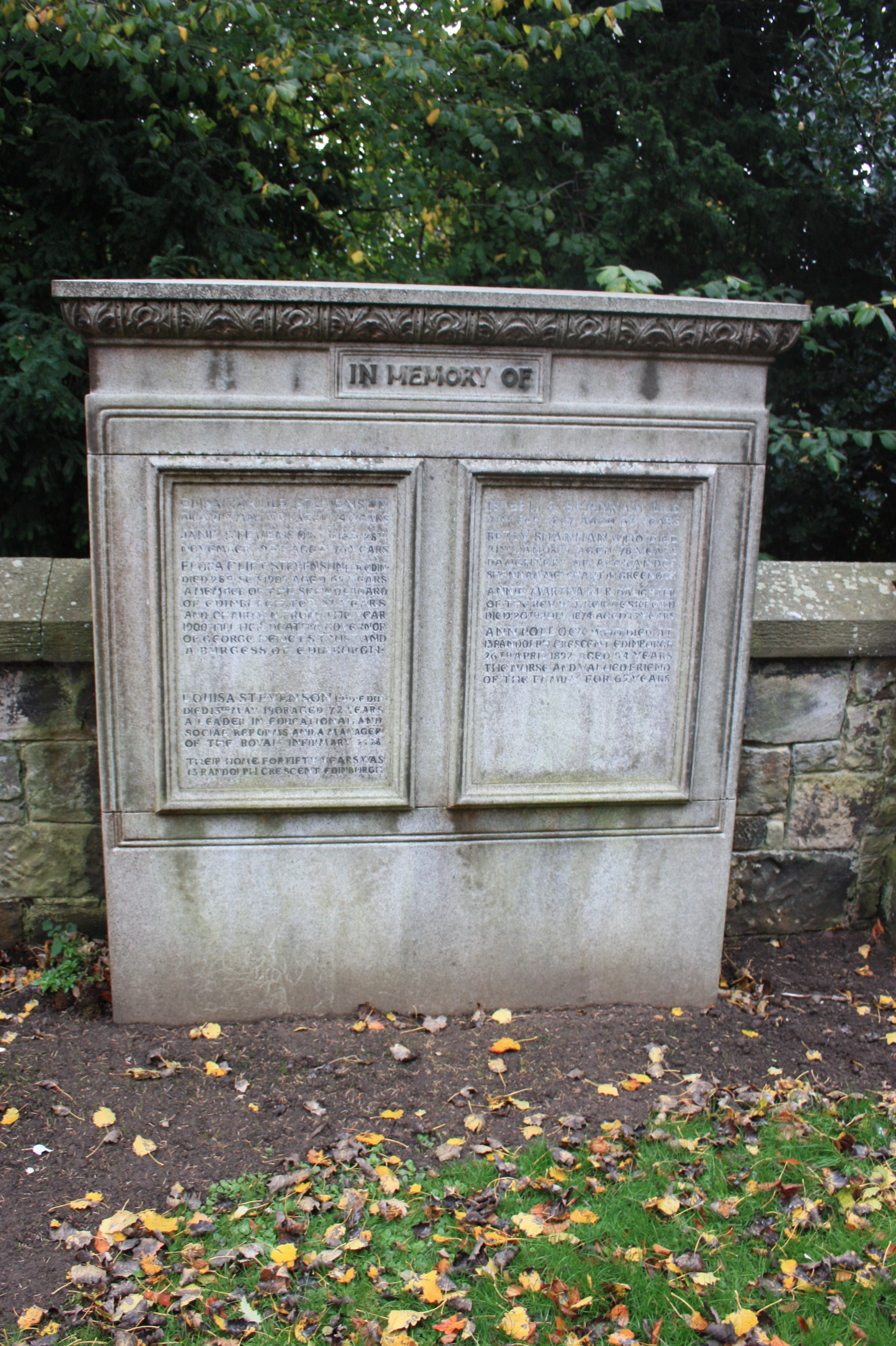
The grave of Flora Stevenson, Dean Cemetery, Edinburgh

In 1899 a new school at Comely Bank, Edinburgh was named after her, and it continues as the Flora Stevenson Primary School, and including the early years of the City of Edinburgh Music School. The last few years of her life brought further honours: an honorary LLD from the University of Edinburgh in 1903, a portrait commissioned by public subscription and painted by Alexander Roche in 1904, the freedom of the City of Edinburgh in 1905. Her final years were spent at her house at 13 Randolph Crescent in Edinburgh's West End.

She was ill and an operation in St Andrews failed to help. She died there in her hotel and was brought back to Edinburgh for a funeral service and burial in the Dean Cemetery on 30 September 1905, two days after her death. The streets on the way to the cemetery were filled with many mourners, including two or three thousand schoolchildren.

Her grave lies on the southern boundary wall above the southern terrace. Her sisters and mother lie with her. Her father lies on her left side.

In 2021, the Royal Bank of Scotland issued a £50 note featuring Stevenson.

== See also ==
- London School Board
