= Petra (given name) =

- Pronunciation: German: [ˈpeːtʁa] Serbo-Croatian: [pêtra]
- Gender: Female
- Language: German, Dutch, Spanish, Portuguese, Swedish, Norwegian, Danish, Finnish, Icelandic, Czech, Croatian, Serbian, Hungarian, Romanian, Bulgarian, Macedonian, Greek, Slovak, Slovene, English, Turkish

Origin
- Origin: Greek
- Meaning: Rock

Petra is a feminine given name. It is a feminine form of Peter, which is derived from the Greek word "πέτρα" (pronounced [ˈpetra]) meaning "stone, rock". It exists as a feminine given name in Germany, Austria, Switzerland, Spain, Portugal, Netherlands, Czech Republic, Finland, Sweden, Norway, Denmark, Iceland, Croatia, Hungary, Romania, North Macedonia, Slovenia, Bulgaria, Serbia, Slovakia, Greece, Turkey, and Latin America.

== Name day ==
June 29 is the name day of Peter and Petra. October 2 is the name day of Petra in Hungary. August 17 is the name day of Petra in Czechia.

== Variants ==
- Bulgarian: Петра (Petra), Петранка (Petranka), Петруна (Petruna), Петя (Petya), Пена (Pena), Пепа (Pepa), Пенка (Penka), Пейка (Peyka, female variant of Peyo), Петка (Petka, could also be derived from the Bulgarian word for Friday (Петък))
- Slovak: Peťka, Peťa, Peti, Peťuš, Peťuška, Peťuša, Petruška, Peťula, Peťulka, Peťulik, Peťuli
- Czech: Péťa, Peťka, Peťula, Petruš, Petruška, Petrunka
- French: Perette, Pierrette, Pierrine, Pétra
- Frisian: Peekje, Pietje, Pierke, Pierkje, Piertje, Peterke, Petje, Petke, Pieterke
- German: Peti, Petrina, Petrine, Pezi, Petzi, Pedi
- Greek: Πέτρα (Petra), Πετρούλα (Petroula)
- Italian: Piera, Pierina
- Macedonian: Петра (Petra), Петранка (Petranka)
- Romanian: Petra, Petria, Petrea

== Notable people with this given name ==
Notable people with this given name include:

- Petra Allende (1920–2002), Puerto Rican activist
- Petra Andersson (born 1993), Swedish football midfielder
- Petra Babiaková (born 1977), Slovak ice hockey defender
- Petra Bagust (born 1972), New Zealand television presenter
- Petra Banović (born 1979), Croatian swimmer
- Petra Barran, British entrepreneur
- Petra Barrera Barrera (born 1961), Mexican politician
- Petra Bartelmann (born 1962), German footballer
- Petra Bauer, Swedish artist and filmmaker
- Petra Bayr (born 1968), Austrian politician
- Petra Beek (born 1973), Dutch softball player
- Petra Begerow (born 1975), German tennis player
- Petra Behle (born 1969), German biathlete
- Petra Bekaert (born 1967), Dutch swimmer
- Petra Beňušková (born 1980), Slovak handball player
- Petra Berger (born 1965), Dutch actor and singer
- Petra Bertholdová (born 1984), Czech footballer
- Petra Bierwirth (born 1960), German politician and member of the SPD
- Petra Blaisse (born 1955), British-born Dutch designer
- Petra Bläss (born 1964), German politician
- Petra Blazek (born 1987), Austrian handball player
- Petra Bockle (born 1995), Kenyan rapper
- Petra Boesler (born 1955), German rower
- Petra Bonfert-Taylor, German mathematician
- Petra Born (born 1965), German ice dancer
- Petra Brocková (born 1976), Slovak actress and stand-up comedian
- Petra de Bruin (born 1962), Dutch cyclist
- Petra Bryant, Czech-born actress and writer
- Petra Brylander (born 1970), Swedish actress and theatre chief
- Petra Burka (born 1946), Canadian figure skater
- Petra Butler, New Zealand law academic
- Petra Buzková (born 1965), Czech lawyer and politician
- Petra Cabot (1907–2006), American designer and artist
- Petra Cabrera, multiple people
- Petra Cada (born 1979), Canadian table tennis player
- Petra Cameron, British chemist
- Petra Černocká (born 1949), Czech singer and actress
- Petra Cetkovská (born 1985), Czech tennis player
- Petra Chaves (born 1978), Portuguese swimmer
- Petra Chocová (born 1986), Czech swimmer
- Petra Cicvarić (born 1986), Croatian actress
- Petra Collins (born 1992), Canadian photographer
- Petra Conti (born 1988), Italian ballerina
- Petra Cortright (born 1986), American artist working in video, painting and digital media
- Petra Costa (born 1983), Brazilian filmmaker and actress
- Petra Dallmann (born 1978), German swimmer
- Petra Damm (born 1961), German women's international footballer
- Petra Daňková (born 1984), Slovak women's ice hockey player
- Petra Davies (1930–2016), Welsh actress
- Petra De Sutter (born 1963), Flemish politician
- Petra Deimer (1948–2024), German marine biologist
- Petra Dettenhöfer (born 1957), German politician
- Petra Dičak (born 1995), Croatian handball player
- Petra Divišová (born 1984), Czech soccer player
- Petra Dizdar (born 1984), Croatian tennis player
- Petra Döll, German hydrologist
- Petra Dortmund (born 1959), German archer
- Petra Dugardein (born 1977), Dutch footballer
- Petra Ecclestone (born 1988), Croatian-English model and fashion designer, daughter of Bernie Ecclestone
- Petra Ekerum (born 1980), Swedish politician
- Petra Elsterová (born 1973), Czech snowboarder
- Petra Ericsson (born 1973), Swedish archer
- Petra Farkas (born 1999), Hungarian long jumper
- Petra Feibert (1958–2010), German chess player
- Petra Felke (born 1959), German athlete
- Petra Feriancová, Slovak artist
- Petra Fontanive (born 1988), Swiss hurdler
- Petra Frey (born 1978), Austrian singer
- Petra Fromme, German-American chemist
- Petra Fuhrmann (1955–2019), German politician
- Petra Gáspár (born 1977), Hungarian tennis player
- Petra Gelbart, Czech human rights activist
- Petra Gerster (born 1955), German journalist and news presenter
- Petra Glavač (born 1982), Croatian footballer
- Petra Göbel (born 1971), Austrian archer
- Petra Gössi (born 1976), Swiss politician
- Petra Grabowski (born 1952), East German canoe racer
- Petra Granlund (born 1987), Swedish swimmer
- Petra Grimbergen (born 1970), Dutch cyclist
- Petra Guttenberger (born 1962), German politician
- Petra Hack, German model
- Petra Haden (born 1971), American singer and violinist
- Petra Hajkova, English Professor of Developmental Epigenetics
- Petra Häkkinen (born 1979), Finnish footballer
- Petra Halmai (born 1997), Hungarian swimmer
- Petra Haltmayr (born 1975), German alpine skier
- Petra Hamman, American bridge player
- Petra Hammesfahr (born 1951), German crime writer
- Petra Hartmann, German novelist, journalist and author
- Petra van der Heide, Dutch harpist
- Petra van Heijst (born 1984), Dutch softball player
- Petra Henzi (born 1969), Swiss mountain biker
- Petra Herrera (1887–1916), Soldadera of Mexican Revolution
- Petra Herzigová (born 1986), Czech ice hockey player
- Petra Hildér (born 1967), Swedish swimmer
- Petra Hillenius (1968–2020), Dutch swimmer
- Petra Hinz (born 1962), German politician
- Petra Hinze (born 1955), East German cross-country skier
- Petra Hogewoning (born 1986), Dutch retired football
- Petra Holubová (born 1968), Czech tennis player
- Petra Horneber (born 1965), German sport shooter
- Petra Fandrem Howard (1891–1971), American labor advocate
- Petra Hřebíčková (born 1979), Czech stage and film actress
- Petra Huber (born 1966), Austrian tennis player
- Petra Hule (born 1999), Australian tennis player
- Petra Hůlová (born 1979), Czech writer
- Petra Hultgren (born 1972), Swedish actress
- Petra Humeňanská (born 1984), Slovak singer and actress
- Petra Huybrechtse (born 1972), Dutch sprinter
- Petra Hynčicová (born 1994), Czech cross-country skier
- Petra Isenberg, computer scientist
- Petra Janů (born 1952), Czech singer and actress
- Petra Jászapáti (born 2000), Hungarian short track speed skater
- Petra Jauch-Delhees (born 1959), Swiss tennis player
- Petra Jebram (born 1954), German gymnast
- Petra Johansson (born 1988), Swedish footballer
- Petra de Jongh (born 1971), Dutch materials chemist
- Petra Joy, German feminist film director, film producer, TV producer, distributor, author and photographer
- Petra Jurčová (born 1987), Slovak ice hockey player
- Petra Kamínková (born 1973), Czech long-distance runner
- Petra Kammerevert (1966–2025), German politician
- Petra Kamstra (born 1974), Dutch tennis player
- Petra Kandarr (1950–2017), East German sprinter
- Petra Kehl, German scholar of the Middle Ages
- Petra Kelly (1947–1992), German politician
- Petra Keppeler (born 1965), German tennis player
- Petra Klinge, neurosurgeon and academic
- Petra Klingler (born 1992), Swiss rock climber
- Petra Klosová (born 1986), Czech swimmer
- Petra Kocsán (born 1998), Hungarian footballer
- Petra Kojdová (born 1993), Czech volleyball player
- Petra Komínková (born 1951), Czech handball player
- Petra Köpping (born 1958), German politician
- Petra Krause (1939–2025), German-Italian terrorist
- Petra Krejsová (born 1990), Czech tennis player
- Petra Krištúfková (born 1977), Slovak politician
- Petra Krol, East German slalom canoeist
- Petra Kronberger (born 1969), Austrian alpine skier
- Petra Krug (born 1963), German hurdler
- Petra Krupková (born 1976), Czech chess player
- Petra Kudláčková (born 1994), Czech handballer
- Petra Kulichová (born 1984), Czech basketball player
- Petra Kuppers, German academic and performance artist
- Petra Kurbjuweit (born 1956), German gymnast
- Petra Kuříková (born 1991), Czech triathlete
- Petra Kurková (born 1973), Czech alpine skier
- Petra Kusch-Lück (born 1948), German host and singer
- Petra Kvitová (born 1990), Czech tennis player
- Petra Lammert (born 1984), German shot putter and bobsledder
- Petra Landers (born 1962), German footballer
- Petra Lang (born 1962), German opera singer
- Petra Langrová (born 1970), Czech former tennis player
- Petra Laseur (1939–2025), Dutch actress
- Petra Letang (born 1979), British actress
- Petra Levin, American microbiologist
- Petra Lewis, professor of radiology and obstetrics
- Petra Lobinger (born 1967), German triple jumper
- Petra Lovas (born 1980), Hungarian table tennis player
- Petra Lundh (born 1963), Swedish lawyer
- Petra Lupačová (1968–1994), Czech handball player
- Petra Luterán (born 1997), Hungarian para-athlete
- Petra Lux, German civil rights activist
- Petra Jimenez Maes (born 1947), American judge
- Petra Majdič (born 1979), Slovenian cross-country skier
- Petra Maňáková (born 1989), Czech handballer
- Petra Mandula (born 1978), Hungarian tennis player
- Petra Marčinko (born 2005), Croatian tennis player
- Petra Markham (born 1944), British actress
- Petra Marklund (born 1984), Swedish singer also known as September
- Petra Martić (born 1991), Croatian tennis player
- Petra Martínez (born 1944), Spanish actress
- Petra Matechová (born 1971), Czech luger
- Petra Mathers (1945–2024), German-American writer
- Petra Mattheis, German artist und photographer
- Petra Mayer (1974–2021), American book review editor and journalist
- Petra Mede (born 1970), Swedish comedian and television host
- Petra Melka (born 1951), German footballer
- Petra Merkel (born 1947), German politician
- Petra Merkert, West German para-alpine skier
- Petra Miescher (born 1971), mayor of Vaduz
- Petra Mohn (1911–1996), Norwegian politician
- Petra Morath-Pusinelli, German organist
- Petra Moroder (born 1968), Italian freestyle skier
- Petra Morsbach (born 1956), German author
- Petra Moser, economist and economic historian
- Petra Müllejans (born 1965), German musician
- Petra Mutzel, German computer scientist
- Petra Nardelli (born 1996), Italian sprinter
- Petra Nareks (born 1982), Slovenian judoka
- Petra Němcová (born 1979), Czech mannequin and photo model
- Petra Nerger (born 1945), German swimmer
- Petra Nicolaisen (born 1965), German politician
- Petra Nielsen (born 1965), Swedish singer and actress
- Petra Niemann (born 1978), German yacht racer
- Petra Nieminen (born 1999), Finnish ice hockey player
- Petra de Nieva, Spanish film editor
- Petra Noskaiová, Slovak classical mezzo-soprano
- Petra Nosková (born 1967), Czech biathlete
- Petra Nováková (born 1993), Czech cross-country skier
- Petra Novotná, multiple people
- Petra Nows (born 1953), German swimmer
- Petra Oberrauner (born 1965), Austrian politician
- Petra Ojaranta (born 1976), Finnish ringette player
- Petra Olli (born 1994), Finnish freestyle wrestler
- Petra Országhová (born 1981), Slovak ice hockey defender
- Petra Östergren (born 1965), Swedish feminist writer, debater, social commentator and instructor in self-defense
- Petra Overzier (born 1982), German badminton player
- Petra Oyston, British researcher
- Petra Pachlová (born 1986), Czech former ice dancer
- Petra Pajalič (born 1988), Slovenian tennis player,
- Petra Papp (born 1993), Hungarian chess player
- Petra Paredez, pastry chef and cookbook author
- Petra Pascal (born 1934), German presenter and singer
- Petra Pau (born 1963), German politician
- Petra Persson, Swedish economist
- Petra Peters (1925–2004), German actress
- Petra Pezelj (born 1998), Croatian footballer
- Petra Pfaff (born 1960), German track and field hurdler
- Petra Pinn (1881–1958), American nurse and hospital administrator
- Petra Platen (born 1959), German handball player
- Petra Polanc (born 2000), Slovenian badminton player
- Petra Polášková (born 1979), Czech footballer
- Petra Popluhárová (born 1988), Slovak handball player
- Petra Pravlíková (born 1985), Slovak ice hockey player
- Petra Priemer (born 1961), East German swimmer
- Petra Procházková (born 1964), Czech journalist and humanitarian worker
- Petra Pudová (born 1987), Czech singer and actress
- Petra Raclavská (born 1973), Czech tennis player
- Petra Rampre (born 1980), Slovenian tennis player
- Petra Reski (born 1958), German journalist
- Petra Reuvekamp, Dutch Paralympic swimmer
- Petra Riedel (born 1964), German swimmer
- Petra Rigby-Jinglöv (born 1969), Swedish professional golfer
- Petra Ritter, German neuroscientist
- Petra Rivers (born 1952), Australian javelin thrower
- Petra Robnik (born 1984), Slovenian alpine skier
- Petra Rohrmann (born 1962), East German cross-country skier
- Petra Rossner (born 1966), German cyclist
- Petra Roth (born 1944), German politician
- Petra Rudolf, German-Italian physicist
- Petra Ruhrmann (1950–2026), German figure skater
- Petra Santy (born 1982), Belgian sprint canoer
- Petra Sax-Scharl, German wheelchair tennis player
- Petra Scharbach (born 1962), German model and artist
- Petra Schersing (born 1965), East German sprinter
- Petra Schlitzer (born 1975), Austrian canoeist
- Petra Schmidt (born 1963), German operatic soprano
- Petra Schmidt-Schaller (born 1980), German actress
- Petra Schmitt (born 1971), Hungarian tennis player
- Petra Schneider (born 1963), German swimmer
- Petra Schürmann (1933–2010), German television host and actress
- Petra Schuurman (born 1968), Dutch chess player
- Petra Schwarz (born 1972), Austrian tennis player
- Petra Schwille (born 1968), German professor
- Petra Seeger, German film director
- Petra Senánszky (born 1994), Hungarian swimmer
- Petra Ševčíková (born 2000), Czech cyclist
- Petra Sičaková (born 2003), Czech javelin thrower
- Petra Sigmund (born 1966), German diplomat
- Petra M. Sijpesteijn (born 1971), Dutch professor of Arabic
- Petra Simon (born 2004), Hungarian handballer
- Petra Sitte (born 1960), German politician
- Petra Slakta (born 1989), Hungarian handball player
- Petra Slováková, Czech canoeist
- Petra Smaržová (born 1990), Slovak para-alpine skier
- Petra Sochorová (born 1978), Czech tennis player
- Petra Sörling (born 1971), Swedish sports administrator
- Petra Soukupová (born 1982), Czech author, playwright and screenwriter
- Petra Špalková (born 1975), Czech actress
- Petra Sprecher, Swiss circus artist and stuntwoman
- Petra Štampalija (born 1980), Croatian basketball player
- Petra Starčević (born 1987), Croatian biathlete
- Petra van Staveren (born 1966), Dutch swimmer
- Petra Štefanková, Slovak illustrator, digital artist, designer, painter, art director and author
- Petra Steger (born 1987), Austrian politician
- Petra Stiasny (born 2001), Swiss cyclist
- Petra Stienen (born 1965), Dutch politician
- Petra Štolbová (born 2001), Czech taekwondo practitioner
- Petra Széles (born 1988), Hungarian volleyball player
- Petra Tanzler (born 1973), Austrian politician
- Petra Teveli (born 1979), Hungarian marathon runner
- Petra Thorén (born 1969), Finnish tennis player
- Petra Thümer (born 1961), East German swimmer
- Petra Tichá-Adámková (born 1991), Czech handball player
- Petra Tierlich (born 1945), German luger
- Petra Todd, American economist
- Petra Tóvizi (born 1999), Hungarian handballer
- Petra Tschetsch (born 1960), German curler
- Petra Uhlig (born 1954), East German handball player
- Petra Ujhelyi (born 1980), Hungarian basketball player
- Petra Unkel (1925–2001), German actress
- Petra Urbánková (born 1991), Czech track and field sprinter
- Petra Vaarakallio (born 1975), Finnish ice hockey player
- Petra Vaelma (born 1982), Finnish footballer
- Petra Văideanu (born 1965), Romanian heptathlete
- Petra Vajdová (born 1985), Slovak actress
- Petra Vámos (born 2000), Hungarian handballer
- Petra Vandrey (born 1965), German lawyer and politician
- Petra Vela de Vidal Kenedy (1823–1885), Mexican rancher
- Petra Verkaik (born 1966), American model
- Petra Vinšová (born 1991), Czech curler
- Petra Vítková (born 1979), Czech handball player
- Petra Vlhová (born 1995), Slovak alpine skier
- Petra Voge (born 1962), East German cross-country skier
- Petra Vogt, German actor
- Petra Volpe (born 1970), Swiss screenwriter and film director
- Petra Vyštejnová (born 1990), Czech footballer
- Petra Wadström (born 1952), Swedish inventor
- Petra Walczewski (born 1968), Swiss cyclist
- Petra Wassiluk (born 1969), German long-distance runner
- Petra Weis (born 1957), German politician
- Petra Wend, British academic
- Petra Wenzel (born 1961), Liechtenstein alpine skier
- Petra Weschenfelder (born 1964), German footballer
- Petra Westerhof (born 1969), Dutch sitting volleyball player
- Petra White (born 1975), Australian poet
- Petra Wilder-Smith, American professor of dentistry
- Petra Wimbersky (born 1982), German footballer
- Petra Wimmer (born 1965), Austrian politician
- Petra Winzenhöller (born 1972), German former professional tennis player
- Petra Wunderlich, German photographer
- Petra Yared (born 1979), Australian actress
- Petra Zahrl (born 1981), Austrian swimmer
- Petra Zais (1957–2021), German politician
- Petra Zakouřilová (born 1978), Czech alpine skier
- Petra Záplatová (born 1991), Czech basketball player
- Petra Zdechovanová (born 1995), Slovak footballer
- Petra Zindler (born 1966), German swimmer
- Petra Zrimšek (born 1988), Slovenian road cyclist
- Petra Zsankó (born 2001), Hungarian cyclist
- Petra Zublasing (born 1989), Italian sport shooter

== Fictional characters ==
- Petra (comics), in Marvel Comics
- Petra, in Broken Sword: The Sleeping Dragon
- Petra, in the webcomic Okashina Okashi – Strange Candy
- Petra, a character from Minecraft: Story Mode.
- Petra Arkanian, in a book series by Orson Scott Card
- Petra, a character from Horizon Zero Dawn.
- Petra Andalee, the protagonist that appears in Blue Balliett's Chasing Vermeer and The Wright 3
- Petra Johanna Lagerkvist, a character from the Arcana Heart video game series
- Petra Leyte, a character from the Re:Zero − Starting Life in Another World anime/light novel series
- Petra Macneary, a character from the video game Fire Emblem: Three Houses and Fire Emblem Warriors: Three Hopes
- Petra Ral, a character from the Attack On Titan anime series
- Queen Petra of Siphnos, a queen from Goddess of Yesterday
- Petra Solano, a character from TV series Jane The Virgin
- Petra Strorm, in John Wyndham's novel The Chrysalids
- Petra Taylor, a character from British soap opera Brookside
- Petra Venj, the main story agent in the "House of Wolves" expansion from the video game Destiny
- Petra Williams, a scientist in the Doctor Who story Inferno.
- Petra, a tinker fairy and best friend of Queen Clarion in the Disney book Wings of Starlight

== See also ==
- Petra (disambiguation)
