= Save Me (animal welfare) =

Animal welfare organisation

Save Me Trust
- Founded: 2010
- Founders: Brian May and Anne Brummer
- Purpose: Animal welfare
- Location: Windlesham
- Product: Giving Wild Animals a Voice
- Key people: Brian May, Founder; Anne Brummer, CEO
- Website: http://www.save-me.org.uk

Save Me is an animal welfare organisation that campaigns against fox hunting and badger culling. It was founded in 2010 by Queen guitarist Brian May and Anne Brummer to campaign against the possible repeal of the Hunting Act in the UK. The campaign is named after the song written by May that was a worldwide hit for Queen in 1980.

== Key campaigns ==
=== Hunting ===
There is a pro-hunting lobby in the UK that is seeking to have the 2004 Hunting Act repealed. Save Me campaigns to ensure that the Hunting Act is preserved.

=== Badger Cull ===
Save Me is currently campaigning as Team Badger, a coalition of animal welfare organisations that have teamed up to fight the planned cull of badgers. The coalition consists of the Royal Society for the Prevention of Cruelty to Animals, League Against Cruel Sports, Humane Society International/UK, Save Me, Stroud 100, Gloucestershire Against Badger Shooting, Animal Aid, Network for Animals, International Fund for Animal Welfare, Animal Defenders International, The David Shepherd Wildlife Foundation, Conservatives against the Badger Cull, Born Free, Care for the Wild, International Animal Rescue and People for the Ethical Treatment of Animals.

These organisations are united in their opposition to the UK Government's plans to cull badgers, and feel strongly that it is a misguided attempt to control the spread of bovine tuberculosis (bTB). If the cull does go ahead as planned, at least 70% of badgers in large areas of the country, many of them healthy, will be killed.

== See also ==
- List of animal welfare groups
- Anti-hunting
