= Animal Survival International =

Animal welfare organisation

- Industry: Animal Welfare
- Founded: 1990
- Founder: Brian Davies
- Headquarters: United Kingdom
- Area served: Worldwide
- Website: animalsurvival.org

Animal Survival International, formerly Political Animal Lobby, is an animal welfare organisation with offices in London, United Kingdom. It was founded in 1990 by animal welfare activist Brian Davies.

In the run-up to the 1997 general election it donated one million pounds to the British Labour Party, which was speculated to have been raised through donations to Davies' other organisation, the International Fund for Animal Welfare. It was later suggested that this was tantamount to a bribe, but George Howarth, then-Parliamentary Under-Secretary of State for the Home Office, denied any connection between the donation and the speculated ban on fox-hunting, which was eventually enacted in the UK in 2004.

In 2002, a British parliamentary motion was tabled congratulating Sky News for a report on the organisation's efforts in opposing the illegal trade in dogs for human consumption in the Philippines.

In 2019, the organisation criticised the decision of the Botswana government to revoke the then five-year ban on elephant hunting.

== See also ==
- International Fund for Animal Welfare
- Network for Animals
- Brian Davies
