= Deimer =

Deimer is a surname of German origin. Notable people with the surname include:

- Josef Deimer (born 1936), German politician
- Kurt Deimer, actor, musician, and Rock singer-songwriter from Cincinnati, OH
- Petra Deimer (1948–2024), German marine biologist, and nature conservationist
