= Guttenberger =

Guttenberger is a German surname. Notable people with the surname include:

- Elisabeth Guttenberger (1926–2014), German political activist
- Petra Guttenberger (born 1962), German politician
