= Goldene Europa =

Goldene Europa award is the oldest German Television award for artists and entertainers. It was awarded from 1968 to 2003. In the years 1989 and 2001, there were no ceremonies. Since 1981, the gala was broadcast on television.

The original sculpture award for the "Goldene Europa" from 1968 is the work of sculptor Herbert Strässer.

The award was originally designed with the aim of launching the careers of German artists and producers with their music facing strong competition from the United States and United Kingdom. Therefore, in the early years only German-language hits were awarded. From 1979, the leadership decided to allow foreign artists to win the Goldene Europa reward. In later years, the Goldene Europa was also awarded in other areas such as comedy, entertainment, politics, sports or drama.

== Award winners ==
,

- 1968 desde Wiesbaden
  - Alexandra
  - Roy Black
  - Rex Gildo
  - Udo Jürgens
  - Vicky Leandros
- 1969 desde Wiesbaden
  - Peter Alexander
  - Christian Anders
  - Katja Ebstein
  - Heintje
  - James Last
  - Petra Pascal
  - Reiner Schöne
- 1970
  - Roy Black
  - Cindy & Bert
  - Michael Holm
  - Peter Maffay
  - Chris Roberts
  - Marianne Rosenberg
- 1971
  - Roy Black
  - Daniela
  - Les Humphries Singers
  - Peter Maffay
  - Martin Mann
  - Reinhard Mey
  - Chris Roberts
- 1972
  - Can
  - Heino
  - Inga und Wolf
  - Freddy Quinn
  - Tony Marshall
  - Juliane Werding
  - Wolfgang
- 1973
  - Christian Anders
  - Cindy & Bert
  - Bernd Clüver
  - Heino
  - Joana
  - Knut Kiesewetter
  - James Krüss
  - Vicky Leandros
  - Loriot
  - Love Generation
  - Jürgen Marcus
  - Reinhard Mey
  - Monica Morell
- 1974
  - Peter Alexander
  - Cindy & Bert
  - Bernd Clüver
  - Gunter Gabriel
  - Elfi Graf
  - Hana Hegerová
  - Heino
  - Mireille Mathieu
  - Nina & Mike
- 1975
  - Cindy & Bert
  - Costa Cordalis
  - Gitte
  - Michael Holm
  - Heidi Kabel
  - Chris Roberts
  - Rentnerband
  - Margot Werner
  - Frank Zander
- 1976
  - Cindy & Bert
  - Udo Jürgens Ein ehrenwertes Haus
  - Michael Kunze
  - Mireille Mathieu
  - Ingrid Peters
- 1977
  - Leonard Bernstein
  - Boney M.
  - Frank Farian
  - Heino
  - Udo Jürgens
  - Ricky King
- 1978
  - Gilbert Bécaud
  - Howard Carpendale
  - Jürgen Drews
  - Udo Jürgens
  - Udo Lindenberg
  - Nana Mouskouri
  - Bonnie Tyler
- 1979
  - Adamo
  - Stig Anderson
  - Jean Marc Cerrone
  - Jürgen Drews
  - Frank Farian
  - Jean-Philippe Iliesco
  - Manfred Krug
  - Bruce Low
  - Mireille Mathieu
  - Vader Abraham
- 1980
  - Peter Alexander
  - Angelo Branduardi
  - The Buggles
  - Dschinghis Khan
  - Peter Maffay
  - Sally Oldfield
  - Thom Pace
- 1981
  - Boney M.
  - Tony Christie
  - Dalida
  - Katja Ebstein
  - Udo Jürgens
  - Robert Palmer
  - Helen Schneider
  - Caterina Valente
  - Stefan Waggershausen
- 1982
  - Albano Carrisi & Romina Power
  - Rudi Carrell
  - Falco
  - Ideal
  - Roland Kaiser
  - Peter Maffay
  - Nicole
  - Shakin' Stevens
  - Spider Murphy Gang
  - Trio
  - Joachim Witt
- 1983
  - Alfred Biolek
  - Culture Club
  - Geier Sturzflug
  - Peter Hofmann
  - Udo Jürgens
  - Mireille Mathieu
  - Nicki
  - Friedrich Nowottny
  - Sydne Rome
  - Peter Schilling
  - Taco
  - Bonnie Tyler
- 1984
  - Alphaville
  - Howard Carpendale
  - Elke Heidenreich
  - Peter Maffay
  - Ulla Meinecke
  - Nena
  - Isabel Varell
  - Peter Weck
  - Jack White
- 1985
  - Benny Andersson, Björn Ulvaeus, Tim Rice, musical Chess
  - Karlheinz Böhm
  - Harold Faltermeyer
  - Headline
  - Udo Jürgens
  - Klaus Lage
  - Modern Talking
  - Alison Moyet
  - Opus
  - Hans Rosenthal
  - Jennifer Rush
  - Purple Schulz
  - Scorpions
- 1986
  - Falco
  - Joachim Fuchsberger
  - Karat
  - Peter Maffay
  - Münchener Freiheit
  - Chris Norman
  - Sandra
  - Jeff Thomas, singer formerly with Duran Duran
  - Working Week
- 1987
  - Alice
  - Howard Carpendale
  - Julien Clerc
  - Hob Goblin
  - Ute Lemper
  - Mary & Gordy
  - Mike Oldfield
- 1988
  - a-ha
  - France Gall
  - Peter Maffay
  - Guesch Patti
  - Pur
  - Chris Rea
  - Umberto Tozzi
  - Vienna Symphonic Orchestra Project
- 1990
  - Cora
  - David Hasselhoff
  - Harald Juhnke
  - Patricia Kaas
  - Harald Kloser
  - Udo Lindenberg
  - Giorgio Moroder
  - Gianna Nannini
  - Roxette
  - Tina Turner
- 1991
  - Edoardo Bennato
  - Erste Allgemeine Verunsicherung
  - Hape Kerkeling
  - Marx Rootschilt Tillermann
  - Orchestral Manoeuvres in the Dark
  - Rod Stewart
  - UB40
  - Caterina Valente
  - Stefan Waggershausen
  - Viktor Lazlo
- 1992
  - Michael Cretu
  - Sandra
  - Genesis
  - Hans-Dietrich Genscher
  - Gipsy Kings
  - Barbara Hendricks
  - Jean Michel Jarre
  - Nigel Kennedy
  - Johnny Logan
  - Scorpions
  - Peter Ustinov
  - Peter Weck
  - Eric Woolfson
- 1993,
  - Dieter Bohlen
  - Bonnie Tyler
  - Justus Frantz
  - Haddaway
  - Maurice Jarre
  - Anna Maria Kaufmann
  - Leslie Mandoki
  - Al Martino
  - Die Prinzen
  - Harald Schmidt
- 1994 Budapest (Hungría)
  - All-4-One
  - Montserrat Caballé
  - Erasure
  - Thomas Gottschalk
  - Gyula Horn
  - Joshua Kadison
  - Lucilectric
  - Reinhard Mey
  - Sinéad O'Connor
  - Cliff Richard
  - 2 Unlimited
- 1995 Bozen
  - Andrea Bocelli
  - Chris de Burgh
  - Luca Carboni
  - Edwyn Collins
  - The Connells
  - Die Doofen
  - The Kelly Family
  - La Bouche
  - Miss Saigon
  - Pur
  - Scatman John
  - Zucchero
- 1996
  - Innsbruck
  - Bryan Adams
  - BAP
  - Shirley Bassey
  - DJ Bobo
  - Flic Flac
  - Fool's Garden
  - Les Misérables
  - Schürzenjäger
  - Die Sendung mit der Maus
  - Spice Girls
  - S.T.S.
- 1997
  - Bee Gees
  - Bellini
  - Gerd Dudenhöffer
  - Klaus Hoffmann
  - The Kelly Family
  - Vanessa Mae
  - No Mercy
  - Bernhard Paul
  - André Rieu
  - Rolf Zuckowski
- 1998
  - 4 the Cause
  - Bell Book & Candle
  - Boyzone
  - Dieter Thomas Heck
  - Udo Jürgens
  - James Last
  - Peter Maffay
  - Michael Mittermeier
  - Mike Oldfield
  - Modern Talking
- 1999
  - Lou Bega
  - Joe Cocker
  - Helmut Lotti
  - Geri Halliwell
  - Rüdiger Hoffmann
  - Oli.P
  - Drew Sarich
  - Sasha
  - Simply Red
  - Günter Wewel
  - Erik Zabel
- 2000
  - a-ha
  - Anastacia
  - ATC
  - Ayman SR 1 Europawelle
  - Franz Beckenbauer
  - Iris Berben
  - Andrea Bocelli,
  - DJ Ötzi,
  - Echt,
  - Bryan Ferry
  - Hans Klok,
  - Udo Lindenberg
  - Frank Nimsgern
- 2002
  - Jeanette Biedermann
  - Bro'Sis
  - Sarah Connor
  - DoRo
  - Josh Groban
  - Patricia Kaas
  - Michael Kunze
  - Reinhard Mey
  - Nicole
  - Uwe Seeler
  - Shakira
  - Jutta Speidel
  - Fritz Wepper
- 2003 Bremen
  - Paul Kuhn
  - Puhdys
  - Otto Waalkes
