= James Robson (doctor) =

Scottish doctor

James Peter Robson MBE (born 24 November 1957) is a Scottish doctor and a former team doctor for the Scotland national rugby union team. He has worked as a physiotherapist and general practitioner and, as part of the medical team, has been to six Rugby World Cups with the Scotland team and on six British & Irish Lions tours.

== Early life ==
Robson was born on 24 November 1957 in Whitehaven in Cumbria. He played rugby for Edinburgh Wanderers.

== Career ==
Robson studied at Queen Margaret College in Edinburgh, graduating in 1980 and then worked as a physiotherapist in the Royal Infirmary of Edinburgh. In 1982 he went on to study medicine at the University of Dundee. While a medical student he became the physiotherapist with district side North and Midlands. He graduated with a medical degree in 1988, He had a combination of doctor and physiotherapist roles for Scotland A squad 1998-2002 and the Scotland sevens 1996-2001. He went on to work as a general practitioner in Dundee for 13 years and continued to be located in the city after this.

Robson's first trip with the Scotland team was to Canada in 1991. He was the physiotherapist for the team at the 1991 Rugby World Cup and he held the position until 1996.

The Scottish Rugby Union nominated him to be on the medical team on the 1993 British Lions tour to New Zealand. On the 1997 British Lions tour to South Africa, Robson was involved with the immediate care of Will Greenwood when he sustained an injury that left him unconscious.

In 2002 Robson became the National Team Doctor for the Scottish Rugby Union. For the 2005 Lions tour to New Zealand, Clive Woodward named him as head doctor as part of the largest coaching and management team in the history of the Lions. Robson had seen the increased incidence of injuries to players that was now occurring, compared to the tours in the amateur era.

On the 2009 Lions tour to South Africa, he had needed to comment about the number of players who had received treatment in hospital after the second test. At the end of the test he expressed concern around the number of injuries and concussions sustained by players- he advised that to protect players changes should be made on future tours, such as matches being spaced further apart.

Robson was on duty with the Scotland team at the Millennium Stadium in 2010 when Thom Evans suffered serious injury and he attended to the player on the pitch. In December 2012, it was announced that he would lead the medical team on the 2013 British & Irish Lions tour to Australia, his sixth successive Lions tour.

After leading research in concussion injuries and raising awareness of them, by 2015 Robson was also calling for review of the way that rugby was played and the rules around the sport. Soon after these calls were made the rugby laws were changed, allowing for players to be taken off the pitch and assessed for concussion and then allowing return to play if they fared well. He was involved in setting up a pilot Brain Health clinic, based at Murrayfield, that opened in 2022 and was intended to support former international rugby players through brain assessments. Later that year, the findings of research were published and indicated that former international rugby players faced a significantly increased risk of neurodegenerative diseases compared to the general population.

In March 2021, he held aloft a Scotland jersey with "250" printed on the back- a gift to commemorate the 250th time that he had attended an international match as the Scotland team doctor. In December 2023, Robson announced that he would retire from his Scotland position after the 2024 Six Nations. On his final home match, Robson was given the honour of lifting the Calcutta Cup on the pitch along with the Scotland players.

== Honours and awards ==
In 2010 he was awarded a fellowship of Royal College of Surgeons of Edinburgh.

In 2018 he was bestowed with an honorary degree by the University of Dundee.

He was made a Member of the Order of the British Empire (MBE) in the 2018 New Year Honours.

In 2024 he was awarded an honorary doctorate by the University of Central Lancashire
