= Familie Heinz Becker =

- Genre: Sitcom, Comedy series
- Created by: Martin Kliemann, Marco Serafini, Rudi Bergmann, Gerd Dudenhöffer
- Starring: Gerd Dudenhöffer, Gregor Weber, Andreas Gergen, Marianne Riedel, Alice Hoffmann, Sabine Urig
- Country of origin: Germany
- No. of seasons: 7
- No. of episodes: 42

Production
- Running time: 30 minutes

Original release
- Network: West 3
- Release: 23 March 1992 – 12 March 2004

Familie Heinz Becker is a German sitcom that aired from 1992 through 2004, created, written and directed by and starring German comedian and cabaret artist Gerd Dudenhöffer. It is based on Dudenhöffer's most famous character Heinz Becker, whom he also had previously played live on stage and continues to play until today in various stage programs.

== Synopsis ==
The show revolves around the everday normal lives of Heinz Becker, a conservative, fuddy-duddy and reactionary ordinary Saarland man, and his family, consisting of his son Stefan and his wife Hilde, as well as those of neighbors and onlookers, although the focus of the series changed over the course of the series.

In the first season, much of the humor was derived from Heinz's petty behavior; the character of his wife, Hilde, was not played for laughs. During seasons 2–4, Hilde's character became more naive but was devoted; much of the humor came from family dialogues. After Season 4, the focus shifted more to public life. Seasons 6 and 7 are not as well esteemed by critics as they repeat a number of older jokes and much of the comedy came from awkward situations, misspeaking, and other more mainstream comedic elements.

As one of the first TV programmes regularly to broadcast the Saarland accent with elements of dialect ("Saarpfälzisch") throughout Germany, it has been seen as contributing to the recognition of the regional culture.

== Episode list ==
Episode	Season	Title	Original air date
01	1	Der Dia-Abend	23 March 1992
02	1	Der neue Anzug	30 March 1992
03	1	Das Gulasch	6 April 1992
04	1	Der Hauptpreis	13 April 1992
05	1	Die Bohrmaschine	20 April 1992
06	1	Die Urlaubsreise	27 April 1992
07	2	Stefans Geburtstag	30 April 1993
08	2	Im Supermarkt	7 May 1993
09	2	Im Taxi	14 May 1993
10	2	Achtunddreißig fünf	21 May 1993
11	2	In der Bar	28 May 1993
12	2	Herzlich Willkommen! Die Direktion	4 June 1993
13	3	Einschließlich Heinz	14 June 1994
14	3	Stefans Job	21 June 1994
15	3	In der Galerie	12 July 1994
16	3	Alle Jahre wieder	19 July 1994
17	3	Die Busfahrt nach Lourdes	9 August 1994
18	3	Modenschau	7 October 1994
19	4	Stromausfall	16 January 1996
20	4	Hilde fährt in Kur	23 January 1996
21	4	Der erste Preis	30 January 1996
22	4	Die Autopanne	6 February 1996
23	4	Die neue Küche	13 February 1996
24	4	Stefan zieht aus	20 February 1996
25	5	Die Berlin-Reise 1.	5 May 1998
26	5	Die Berlin-Reise 2.	12 May 1998
27	5	In der Telefonzelle	19 May 1998
28	5	Ein neues Auto?	26 May 1998
29	5	Der Hausball	2 June 1998
30	5	Der Kurschatten	9 June 1998
31	6	Spurlos verschwunden	23 October 2001
32	6	Zimmer 112 A	30 October 2001
33	6	Bier oder Wein	6 November 2001
34	6	Krach	13 November 2001
35	6	Hallo!	20 November 2001
36	6	Was iss'n passiert?	18 December 2001
37	7	Auf Händen und Knien	6 February 2004
38	7	Abgetaucht	13 February 2004
39	7	Ex und Hopp	20 February 2004
40	7	Geisterfahrer	27 February 2004
41	7	Oben rechts die 4	5 March 2004
42	7	Stau	12 March 2004
