= Queen Margaret University =

University in Musselburgh, Scotland

- Coat of arms
- Former names: Queen Margaret University College; Queen Margaret College
- Type: Public
- Established: 1875; 151 years ago
- Affiliations: MillionPlus; Universities UK
- Chancellor: Patrick Grant
- Principal: Sir Paul Grice
- Students: 6,590 (2024/25)
- Undergraduates: 3,830 (2024/25)
- Postgraduates: 2,760 (2024/25)
- Location: Musselburgh, East Lothian, Scotland; 55°55′53″N 3°04′23″W
- Colours: Dark Grey, Muted Blue, Silver and Black
- Website: www.qmu.ac.uk

Queen Margaret University (QMU) is a public university in Musselburgh, East Lothian, Scotland. It is named after Saint Margaret, Queen consort of Alba.

The university can trace its origins to the Edinburgh School of Cookery and Domestic Science, founded in 1875. Renamed Queen Margaret College from 1972, and then Queen Margaret University College in 1999, it was awarded full university status in January 2007.

== History ==
The university was founded in Edinburgh in the year 1875, as the Edinburgh School of Cookery and Domestic Science by Christian Guthrie Wright and Louisa Stevenson, both members of the Edinburgh Ladies' Educational Association. The school was founded as a women-only institution, with twin aims of improving women's access to higher education and improving the diets of working class families. Teaching was initially delivered via lectures at the Royal Museum, supplemented by a programme of public lectures and demonstrations delivered nationwide, but in 1877 the school established a base at Shandwick Place, in Haymarket.

The school moved in 1891 to Atholl Crescent, expanding its courses and offering residential places to students. In the same year, HRH Princess Louise, Duchess of Argyll became Patron of the institution until her death in 1939. In 1909, the school was designated a central institution and brought under the public control of the Scottish Education Department. The first principal appointed was Ethel De la Cour. De la Cour retired in 1930, and in the same year the school became the Edinburgh College of Domestic Science.

In 1961, the college acquired its Corstorphine campus, purchasing a portion of the Clermiston estate from developers. The campus was first occupied by the college in 1970, opened by HRH Princess Alice, Duchess of Gloucester who had become Patron of the institution in 1940 and remained Patron until her death. In 1972, the name Queen Margaret was adopted to dissociate the college from the narrow field of domestic science. Thereafter, the college broadened its range of courses, especially in the dramatic arts and paramedical healthcare fields. The following institutions have since been absorbed by Queen Margaret:

- The Edinburgh College of Speech and Drama (established 1929, joined 1971)
- The Edinburgh School of Speech Therapy (established 1946, joined 1975)
- The Royal Infirmary of Edinburgh School of Physiotherapy (established 1940, joined 1978)
- The Astley Ainslie Hospital Occupational Therapy Training Centre (established 1937, joined 1979)
- The Edinburgh Foot Clinic and School of Chiropody (established 1924, joined 1984)
- The Edinburgh School of Radiography (established 1936, joined 1992)
- The Edinburgh University Settlement School of Art Therapy (established 1992, joined 1997)

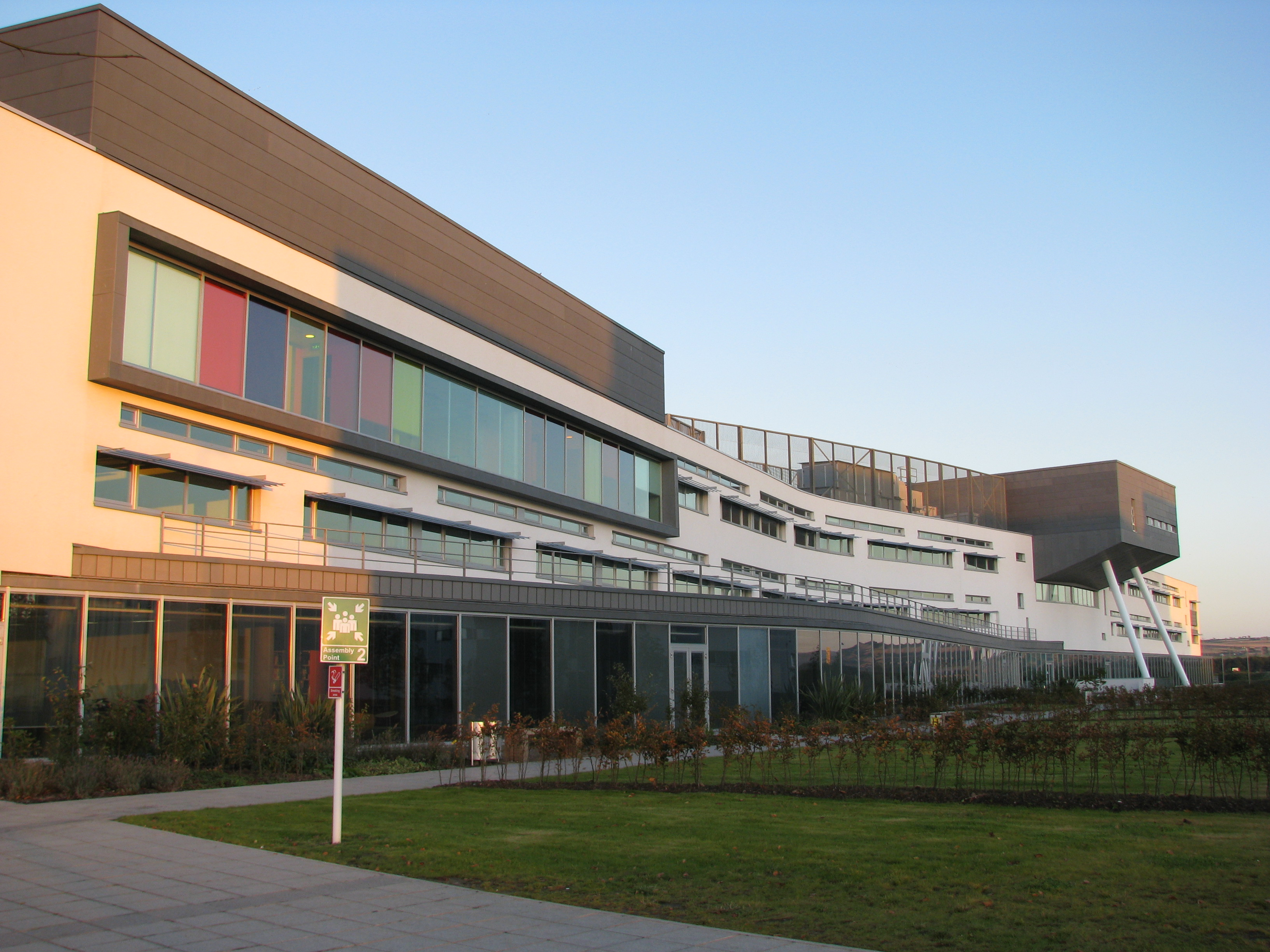
Musselburgh campus, Queen Margaret University

In 1992, the Privy Council granted Queen Margaret College powers to award its own taught degrees, and in 1998, the college was granted full degree powers, which enabled it to award its own research and higher degrees. As a result, in January 1999 the institution took the name Queen Margaret University College. After the University College attained the final criteria of acquiring a minimum of 5000 students (something that could not be gained earlier as the former campuses could not accommodate that number of students), the institution was awarded full university status, becoming Queen Margaret University, Edinburgh in January 2007.

In 2012, QMU became the first university in Scotland to have a Business Gateway on campus.

Scotland's First Minister, Alex Salmond announced in May 2010 that QMU was to be the official host of the archives for Homecoming Scotland 2009. The Homecoming Scotland Archive will collect, catalogue and preserve materials associated with Scottish Homecoming 2009.

== Campuses ==
=== Former campuses ===
Before moving to a new campus just outside Musselburgh in the autumn of 2007, Queen Margaret University had been based at three campuses throughout Edinburgh. They were located in Corstorphine (to the West of Edinburgh), in Leith, and at the Gateway Theatre – home of the university’s, and UK’s, leading Drama School and Scotland's International Drama Centre. The Gateway Theatre was a former television studio previously owned by Scottish Television on Elm Row, Leith Walk.

=== New campus ===
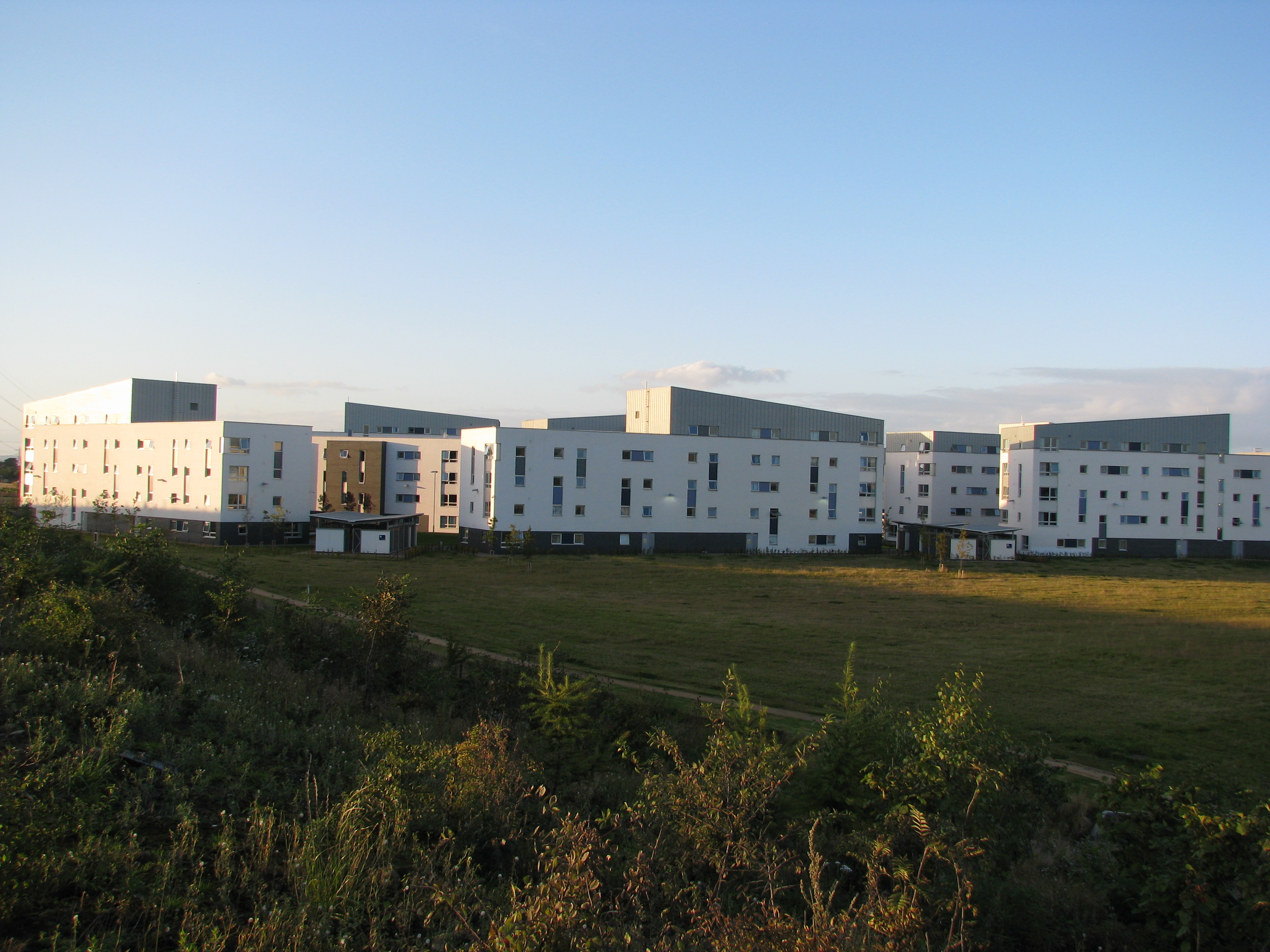
Student accommodation at the Musselburgh campus

In 2007–2008, the university brought together students from its three campuses in Edinburgh by moving to a new purpose-built campus near Musselburgh, East Lothian. Costing £100 million, the new campus covers 35 acres (14 hectares) and holds educational buildings, a students union, a small gym and halls of residence of more than 800 rooms.

QMU has been "touted as the country's greenest University campus". The campus was designed by Dyer Architects to exceed current environmental standards and sets a new benchmark in sustainable design. The entire development transformed a 35-acre (14-hectare) site from low-grade farmland into landscaped parkland. The new campus was officially opened by Her Majesty the Queen on 4 July 2008.

In June 2015, Queen Margaret University announced it would hold public consultations for plans to build a new innovation park and shopping hub on open land around the Musselburgh campus. Site proposals are being developed by CAM-SCI, a Cambridge-based economic consultancy, which has developed science parks across the UK. The Edinburgh Innovation Hub opened adjacent to the university campus in 2026. Plans for further development are now underway.

==== Learning Resource Centre ====
The Learning Resource Centre (LRC) comprises approximately 4,500 square metres (0.45 hectares) of the main academic building. Located at the heart of the campus, it provides library, IT and AV services to students, staff and visitors of the university. The LRC consists of a facility for both directed and self-directed study, based on an integrated library and information service provision. The LRC has 1,000 study spaces organised as a mixture of silent and group study areas, bookable group study rooms, training rooms, assistive technology, student learning support and a postgraduate study room.

==== Media Services ====
The Media Services department provides audio-visual services to the university. This includes the provision of AV equipment in classrooms and lecture theatres as well as more specialised services such as graphics, photography, video-conferencing and TV studio facilities.

== Organisation ==
=== School of Arts, Social Sciences and Management ===
Following restructuring in early 2010, the schools of Social Sciences, Media and Communication, Business, Enterprise and Management, and Drama and Creative Industries were merged. The present dean is Professor David Stevenson. The school offers courses in 'Business, Enterprise and Management', which contains the International Centre for the Study of Planned Events; 'Governance, Justice and Public Management'; 'Hospitality and Gastronomy'; Creativity and Culture'; and 'Public Relations'.

QMU was part of the Scottish Drama Training Network which was set up by the Scottish Funding Council in 2010 to foster cohesion across stage and screen professional practice, education and training. Through the Network, QMU in partnership with Edinburgh Napier University delivered the BA (Hons) Acting for Stage and Screen. Since the Training Network ceased QMU is now, once again, offering its own acting and performance training programmes delivering the BA (Hons) Acting and Performance and BA (Hons) Performance along with its four year BA (Hons) Drama programme. It is also the only institution in Scotland offering a BA (Hons) in Theatre and Film as well as a Masters in Stage Management & Technical Theatre Production. It is also only one of three places in Scotland to offer a degree in Costume Design and Construction. In 2021/22 QMU celebrated 50 years of professional drama training. The Guardian's university rankings for 2024 declared the Drama programmes at QMU as one of the top ten institutions in the UK as well as Scotland's top place to study and train in Drama.

The school is the only institution in Scotland that is accredited by the Chartered Institute of Public Relations to deliver the postgraduate CIPR Diploma in Public Relations. The school's Bachelor of Science (BSc) courses in psychology; MSc in Health Psychology are accredited by the British Psychological Society.

BA (Hons) Film and Media graduate, Agata Jagodzinska, was awarded Best Writer at the BAFTA in Scotland New Talent Awards.

In 2019 Queen Margaret University became a key player in the delivery of Initial Teacher Education in Scotland offering the BA (Hons) in Primary Education and a BA (Hons) in Education Studies along with an expanding postgraduate PGDE programme in Home Economics, Business Education and Religious, Moral and Philosophical Studies.

=== School of Health Sciences ===
The School of Health Sciences offers the widest range of professional healthcare courses of any university in Scotland. The present dean is Professor Sara Smith. The school offers courses in dietetics, nutrition and biological sciences; nursing; paramedic science; speech and language therapy, audiology, occupational therapy and art therapy; physiotherapy; podiatry and radiography. Postgraduate courses are offered in (international) art psychotherapy, music therapy and dramatherapy: QMU is the only institution in Scotland offering these fully HCPC accredited therapy courses as a Master of Science (MSc).

The subject area of Speech and Hearing Sciences won the Queen's Anniversary Prize for research into the clinical applications of speech technology carried out in the Speech Science Research Centre. The Guardian University ranking poll for 2024 declared that QMU's BSc (Hons)/MNurse Nursing degree programme was ranked 6th in the UK and that the BSc Paramedic Science course was rated as the top course in the United Kingdom for the training of paramedics.

=== Governance ===
In October 2016, Dame Prue Leith became Chancellor, succeeding Sir Tom Farmer. In July 2025 Patrick Grant took over the ceremonial role of Chancellor of the university when Leith stood down.

Sir Paul Grice assumed the role of Principal and Vice-chancellor in October 2019. He was knighted in the New Year Honours List 2016 for services to the Scottish Parliament and services to higher education and the community in Scotland. Grice was Chief Executive and Clerk of the Scottish Parliament prior to his appointment to Queen Margaret University succeeding Professor Petra Wend.

Professor Petra Wend joined Queen Margaret University in September 2009. She originally read Italian and French Language and Literature, and Education at the University of Münster in Germany. Following a series of positions at UK universities, she joined Oxford Brookes University as Deputy Vice-Chancellor (Academic) and Deputy Chief Executive in 2005 before joining Queen Margaret in 2009. She retired from her position in 2019.

== Academic profile ==
=== Rankings and reputation ===
Rankings
National rankings
- Complete (2027): 102=
- Guardian (2027): 96
- Times / Sunday Times (2027): 66

Global rankings
- QS (2027): 1201–1400

In June 2012 the management team at Queen Margaret University, Edinburgh, was presented with the Times Higher Education Leadership and Management Team Award.

QMU won the e-Government National Award 2010 in the category for sustainable, 'green IT' or 'carbon-efficient' services. In autumn 2010 it picked up gold at the Scottish Green Awards, and in 2009 it won an award for a waste management project, as well as a Green Apple Award.

=== Research ===
The university has three flagships: health and rehabilitation; creativity and culture; and sustainable business.

Queen Margaret University, Edinburgh, has seven research centres:

- Centre for Health, Activity and Rehabilitation Research
- Centre for Applied Social Sciences
- Centre for Person-centred Practice Research
- Clinical Audiology, Speech and Language Research Centre
- Institute for Global Health and Development
- Centre for Communication, Cultural and Media Studies
- Scottish Centre for Food Development and Innovation

The university operates an open access repository of the research output of the university, called eResearch, with the intention of making the work of researchers open and available to the public via the web.

Queen Margaret University researchers in food and drink in partnerships with Advanced Microwave Technologies Ltd (AMT), won two major awards for innovation and partnership in 2012 for their collaboration to explore the application of microwave technologies to the food and drink sector.

== Notable alumni ==
Performing arts
- Katrina Bryan
- Tam Dean Burn
- Jimmy Chisholm
- Angel Coulby
- Mark Cox
- Jeanie Drynan
- Michelle Duncan
- Kellyanne Farquhar
- Carter Ferguson
- Lewis Gribben
- Vicky Hall
- Craig Hill
- Gbemisola Ikumelo
- Ashley Jensen
- Sean Kane
- Simone Lahbib
- Jemima Levick
- James Mackenzie
- Jane McCarry
- Allison McKenzie
- Kevin McKidd
- Janine Mellor
- Helen Modern
- Michael Nardone
- Elaine C Smith

Health sciences

- Fatou Baldeh MBE, leading woman's rights activist for FGM/C
- Dame Louise Martin, former president of Commonwealth Sport
- James Robson, MBE, Scottish Rugby's chief medical officer and British Lions Rugby's team doctor

Media

- Douglas Anderson, television presenter
- Matt Baker, television presenter, Blue Peter and The One Show
- Edith Bowman, BBC Radio 1 & television presenter
- Andrea Brymer, news reporter, STV
- Mark Hirst, reporter, STV News at Six; producer; editor-in-chief, Radio Sputnik

Military

- Commodore Inga Kennedy, head of the Royal Navy Medical Service

Music

- Susan Boyle, Grammy-nominated and World Music Award-winning singer

Politics and public administration

- Michael Matheson, Member of the Scottish Parliament, former Cabinet Secretary for NHS Recovery, Health and Social Care
- Seif Rashidi, politician
- Shirley-Anne Somerville, Member of the Scottish Parliament, Cabinet Secretary for Social Justice

Sports

- Martin Cimprich, International Rugby Union player for the Czech Republic
- Heather O'Brien, International Rugby Union player for Ireland Women

== See also ==
- Armorial of British universities
- List of universities in the United Kingdom
- Universities in Scotland
