= Gerd Dudenhöffer =

German cabaret artist

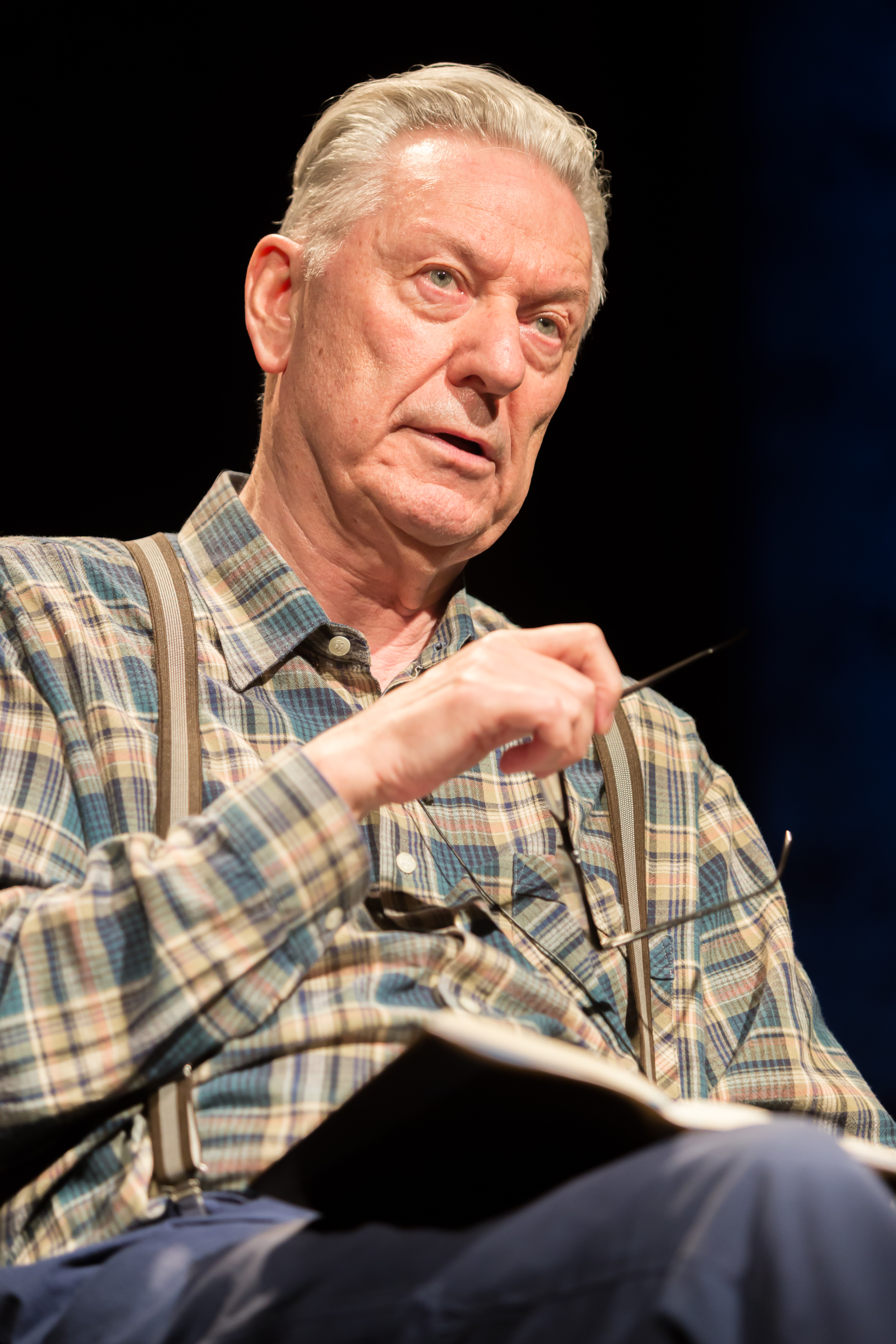
Dudenhöffer in 2014

Gerd Dudenhöffer (born 13 October 1949 in Bexbach, Saarland) is a German cabaret artist and writer.

== Life ==
Dudenhöffer studied graphic and design in Munich. Since 1977, he works in Germany as a cabaret artist. His most famous role is Heinz Becker. Dudenhöffer is married and has two children.

== Dudenhöffer's character "Heinz Becker" ==
Heinz Becker is an elderly catholic-conservative working-class man. He lives with his wife and son in a small rural town, a place where each knows everyone else and people often have family ties between them (the model obviously is Dudenhöffer's home town of Bexbach). Becker has poor formal education, speaks the local dialect and often hesitates to find the right words. Technical or sophisticated terms he normally misuses. The corner stones of his simple life are his friends in the local pub, renovating his house and gardening and participation in the activities of the local volunteers firebrigade and soccer club. With this background he comments on many developments and tendencies of modern metropolitan life: "mixed marriages" between Catholics and Protestants, marriages between homosexuals, old age sexuality, vegetarianism, foreigners and immigrants, climate change etc. He often explains his opinion through comparison to banal experiences made in his community and uses highly politically incorrect language. He is the, seemingly stupid, freshwater philosopher who holds a mirror to intellectuals from the big cities and their life style.

In 1998 occurred a public controversy whether the stage character of "Heinz Becker" has a negative influence on the reputation of the German land of Saarland. Since then Dudenhöffer performs only outside of his homeland of Saarland.

== Filmography ==
- 1991: Pappa ante Portas (waiter)
- 1992–2004: Familie Heinz Becker (TV-serie)
- 1999: Tach, Herr Dokter! – Der Heinz-Becker-Film

== Books ==
- 1984: Die Heinz Becker Story (Gerhard Bungert, Gerd Dudenhöffer, Charly Lehnert; Queißer Verlag), ISBN 978-3-921815-52-6
- 1986: "…alles geschwätzt!" Heinz Becker erzählt (rororo tomate), ISBN 978-3-499-15949-7
- 1998: Opuscula – Lyrische Gedichde (sic!), Eichborn, ISBN 978-3-8218-3536-5
- 1999: Tach Herr Dokter, Eichborn, ISBN 978-3-8218-3489-4
- 2001: Opuscula Nova, Eichborn, ISBN 978-3-8218-3725-3
- 2005: Die Reise nach Talibu, Handwerker Promotion, ISBN 978-3-00-017191-8

== Awards ==
- 1994: – Telestar for "Beste Comedy-Serie": „Familie Heinz Becker“
- 1996: – Saarland Order of Merit
- 1997: – Goldene Europa by SR: erfolgreichste Comedy-Serie in der ARD: „Familie Heinz Becker“
- 2004: – Deutscher Comedypreis: Beste Comedy-Serie: „Familie Heinz Becker“
