= Network for Animals =

Animal welfare organization

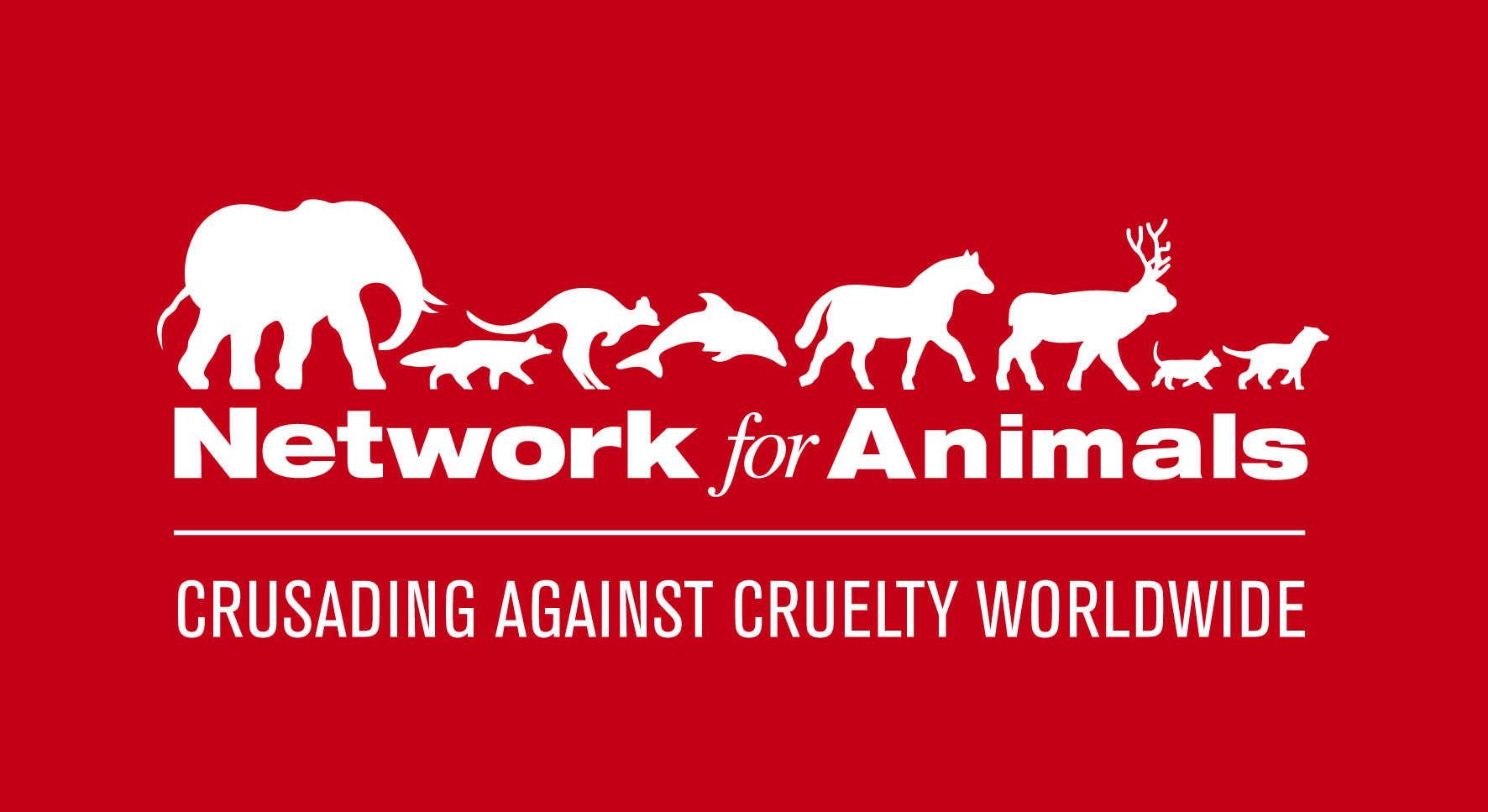
- Industry: Charity; Animal Welfare
- Founded: 1997
- Founder: Brian Davies
- Headquarters: United Kingdom
- Area served: Worldwide
- Key people: Gloria Davies (Chief Executive Officer); David Barritt (Executive Director))
- Website: networkforanimals.org

Network for Animals (NFA) is an animal welfare organization that provides logistical and financial support for related initiatives in various countries. Headquartered in the United Kingdom and with offices in the United States and South Africa, the current CEO is co-founder Gloria Davies.

== History ==
NFA was founded in 1997 by animal welfare activist Brian Davies, founder of associated organisations the International Fund for Animal Welfare in 1969, and Animal Survival International (formerly Political Animal Lobby) in 1990. On the death of Brian Davies in 2022, his wife Gloria Davies became CEO of the organisation.

Initially focusing on issues related to the dog-meat trade in the Philippines, NFA later expanded to other animal welfare issues in its campaigns. NFA reportedly focuses on providing practical assistance to animals, while Animal Survival International focuses on lobbying for political solutions.

== Activity ==
NFA receives no government grants and is funded primarily by direct-mail donations and online appeals. NFA has shared footage of cruelty cases online to highlight cases of animal cruelty, and also produced a series of podcasts in 2020 on the topic.

NFA has participated in various projects and advocacy work around the world, including:

- Supporting efforts to end organized horse fighting in Mindanao, Philippines, by providing free veterinary clinics, distributing literature and advertising against the practice.
- Supporting a donkey sanctuary in Bulawayo, Zimbabwe, that combats cruelty and campaigns to end the donkey-skin trade, providing food to donkeys in South Africa during the coronavirus pandemic, and running outreach programs for donkey owners in Limpopo.
- Participating in projects to improve the welfare of street cats in South Africa, Italy, and Greece, including funding spay and neuter programs, providing food, and funding rescue shelters.
- Supporting disaster relief efforts for animals such as providing funding for specialized food in the danger area and work to rescue and reunite owners and animals.
- Supporting to end the dog meat trade in the Phllippines by promoting rabies awareness, investigating and raiding suspect slaughterhouses.
- Working with rangers at Addo Elephant National Park to finance reintroduce tusked elephants into the gene pool and support elephant relocation.
- Running the "Dogs in Distress" campaign, assisting several dog shelters with funds in various countries, such as South Africa

== See also ==
- Brian Davies (activist)
- International Fund for Animal Welfare
- Political Animal Lobby
