= Brian Davies (activist) =

British animal welfare activist (1935–2022)

Brian Davies (4 February 1935 – 27 December 2022) was a Welsh animal welfare activist who founded three major international animal welfare organizations, Network for Animals (NFA), Animal Survival International (ASI) and the International Fund for Animal Welfare (IFAW). Davies retired from the IFAW in 2003, but remained active at the NFA and ASI.

== Life and career ==
=== Early life ===
Davies was born on 4 February 1935 in the Welsh mining village of Tonyrefail. Much of his early childhood was spent with his grandparents while his parents served in the war effort. His father was a rear gunner in the Royal Air Force, posted to India, and his mother worked in a munitions factory, returning home only on weekends. At the end of the war, when Davies was 11, the family moved to England. He left school at 14, because of ill health, and worked at various manual jobs throughout his youth. Davies met his first wife, Joan, in 1955. The couple emigrated to Canada where they had two children, Nicholas and Toni. When Davies joined the Canadian army in the following year, the family relocated to the town of Oromocto in the province of New Brunswick.

=== Beginnings of a career in animal welfare ===
Davies’ interest in animal welfare began in 1958 when a car struck a dog outside the family's home. Because there was no local vet, Davies contacted the Fredericton SPCA and took the dog to the Fredericton Animal Hospital. This incident resulted in Davies becoming the Oromocto representative for the SPCA on an unofficial and unpaid basis. Upon being offered the job of field secretary for the New Brunswick PCA (NB SPCA) in 1961, Davies resigned from the military. From 1964–1969, Davies served as executive secretary for the NB SPCA, which was considered by some of its prominent members to be lacking in influence and drive, according to the society's minutes. Over the period of Davies’ tenure, he oversaw the group's transformation from one focused primarily on humane education for school children and the inspection of cases of animal cruelty, to an organisation that sought to address animal welfare issues at multiple societal levels. It was through his involvement with the NB SPCA that Davies learned of the commercial seal hunting industry in North East Canada.

=== Opposition to Canadian seal hunt ===
Davies’ first visit to the Canadian harp seal hunt, accompanied by Jacques Vallée, the general manager of the Canadian SPCA, was on 12 March 1965 – a year which saw a total of 182,758 seals killed for their pelts and fat. On returning to his base in Prince Edward Island, Davies found two live seal pups on the shoreline that had been taken there by sealers. He took them to his home in Oromocto where they were raised by the Davies family. A local paper ran a story on their efforts to save the seals, resulting in national media attention and an influx of funding with which the Davies would run the “Save the Seals” campaign.

=== International Fund for Animal Welfare ===
In 1969 the NB SPCA withdrew from the seal campaign, having concluded that it was conducted humanely and arguing that it was “draining too much attention and effort away from other matters the society took responsibility for”. Despite the split with the SPCA, Davies sought to further develop the seal campaign and used the “Save the Seals” fund to found the International Fund for Animal Welfare (IFAW). Davies promoted opposition to the seal hunt by enlisting the support of prominent celebrities, such as French actress Brigitte Bardot, to appear before cameras at the site of the hunt and to emphasise the cruelty taking place. The stance Davies took against the seal hunt resulted in antagonism from the Canadian government, which sought to distance itself from the increasingly negative image of the hunt. The tension peaked in 1977, when Davies was charged with violating the Seal Protection Regulations by operating a helicopter in a prohibited area. He was sentenced to a jail term of twenty-one days, a $1,000 fine or six months additional jail time, and probation conditions which forbade him to fly any craft over the Gulf or Front for three years. Moreover, the Canadian government warned IFAW that continued campaigning would result in the termination of IFAW's tax-exempt charitable status. The pressure drove IFAW to voluntarily relinquish its charitable status and move its headquarters to the United States. In light of the increasing difficulty of campaigning in Canada, Davies began lobbying in Europe for the closure of international markets for the products of the hunt. In 1983, 18 years after the start of the seal campaign, the European Union General Court placed a ban on the importation of newborn harp seals (whitecoats) and hooded seal pups (bluebacks) throughout Europe, resulting in a huge reduction in seals killed in Canada's commercial seal hunt.

In 1984, Davies established the IFAW Charitable Trust (IFAW CT) and the Political Animal Lobby (PAL), which enabled the development of relationships with political figures. In order to increase fundraising Davies developed a system of direct mail fundraising in which computer software filtered members according to geographic location, interests and the amount and date of their last contribution. These methods helped spur the organization's rapid growth.

=== Political Animal Lobby/Animal Survival International ===
Davies retired from IFAW to continue working with the Political Animal Lobby (PAL). PAL directed lobbying efforts at government ministers and other political decision-makers. Instead of demanding new legislation, PAL provided technical advice in an attempt to build working relationships with sympathetic politicians, and began making strategic donations to political parties. By 1996, PAL had made donations to a number of British political parties, most notably a £1-million donation to the Labour Party. in 2021, PAL shifted its focus to concentrate on wild animals affected by climate change and was renamed Animal Survival International. It focuses on direct aid in urgent situations, drought relief, anti-poaching and the protection and expansion of habitats. ASI is particularly active in South Africa working closely with the Addo National Elephant Park.

=== Network For Animals ===
Davies founded Network for Animals (NFA) in 1996. NFA is a campaign-directed animal welfare organisation, which initially focused on the dog-meat trade in the Philippines. The NFA has subsequently increased its scope to include a wide range of animal welfare issues in its campaigns. In the UK, it campaigns against badger culling and snaring. In South Africa, it funds numerous animal shelter partners, primarily focused on dogs, cats and donkeys. Caring for street dogs is a major focus for NFA. It provides food and veterinary care for street dogs in Bosnia, Croatia, Greece, Italy, Jordan, Kenya, Montenegro, the Philippines, Serbia, South Africa, Thailand, Turkey, Uruguay and Zimbabwe.

=== Death ===
Davies died in the United States, on 27 December 2022, at the age of 87.
