= International Centre for the Study of Planned Events =

The International Centre for the Study of Planned Events
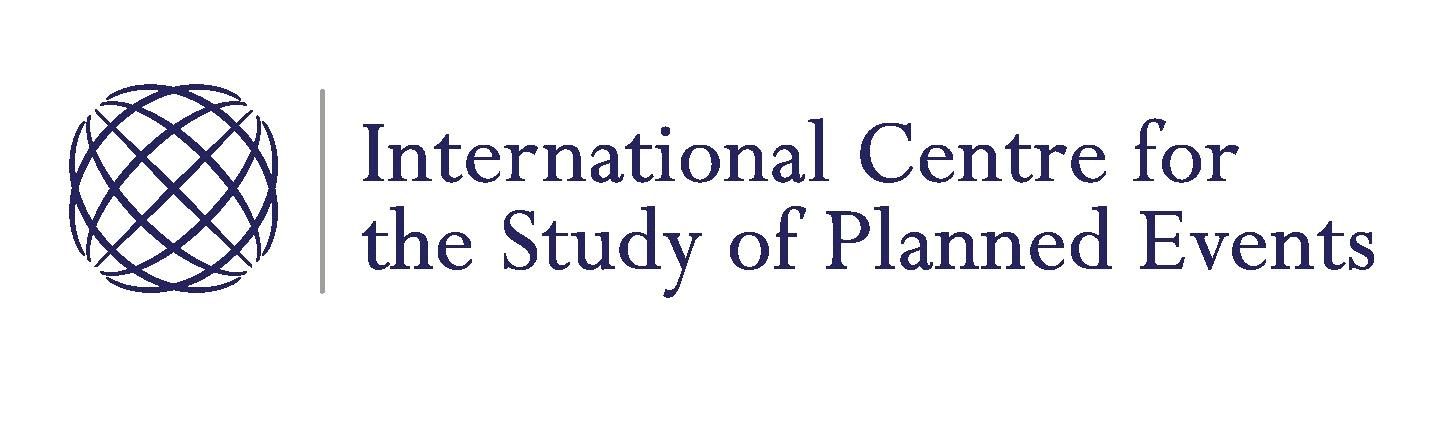
- Type: Public
- Established: 2008
- Executive Director: Professor Joe Goldblatt
- Administrative staff: Kuan-wen Lin(林冠文), Research Coordinator & PhD Student
- Location: Musselburgh, Scotland, UK
- Nickname: ICSPE
- Website: http://www.qmu.ac.uk/be/research/Planned_events.htm

The International Centre for the Study of Planned Events (ICSPE) is a research centre within the School of Business, Enterprise and Management at Queen Margaret University in Musselburgh, Scotland, founded in 2008. Professor Joe Goldblatt is the founding director and the author of the first textbook in the field of events management.

The Centre which is located in Musselburgh is the world's first International Centre for the Study of Planned Events through scientific research and is the first Global Centre for the development of Eventology

The International Centre is the only institution of its kind in the world dedicated to providing government, event professionals and sponsors with scientific evidence of the linkages between planned events and education, health, wealth, the meaning of life, environmental sustainability and social cohesion. The International Centre provides assessment and evaluation, research and development services for government officials and policy makers, event professionals in corporations, festivals, sports and corporate sponsors.

The centre conducts research to advance the formation of government policy and promote industry sustainability in the field of Planned Events such as festivals, fairs, conferences and meetings. The Centre assists the festival and events industry to identify predictable, reliable and sustainable funding . It also provides evidence of how Planned Events can promote social cohesion, improved educational and health outcomes, sustainable environmental advancement as well as bringing economic benefits to society.

The centre was launched on 21 Aug 2008 with a public lecture presented by Jean McFaddin, executive producer of the Macy*s Thanksgiving Day Parade in New York City.
