= Carter Ferguson =

- Education: Queen Margaret University
- Occupations: Film Director, Actor; Fight Choreographer
- Years active: 1996-Present
- Notable work: Fast Romance; Taggart

Carter Ferguson is an international fight choreographer, mental health advocate and podcaster. As a director, his 1st feature film Fast Romance won the Audience Award, voted for by the public, at the 2011 British Academy Scotland Awards. The film also screened at the 2011 edition of the Edinburgh International Film Festival.

Carter trained at Edinburgh’s Queen Margaret University School of Drama.

== Television ==
From 2004 to 2005, he played PC Harry Black in the soap opera River City.

== Filmography ==
Carter has directed fight sequences on over 800 productions and works mostly in Scotland. Recent credits include Guilt, River City, Shetland and The Nest.

== Awards ==
Year	Nominated Work	Awards	Category	Result
2011	Fast Romance	British Academy Scotland Awards	Cineworld Audience Award	Won
