= Schlammersdorf =

- Municipality
- Coat of arms

- Location of Schlammersdorf within Neustadt a.d.Waldnaab district
- Interactive map of Schlammersdorf
- Location within Germany Location within Bavaria
- Coordinates: 49°47′N 11°43′E
- Country: Germany
- State: Bavaria
- Admin. region: Oberpfalz
- District: Neustadt a.d.Waldnaab
- Municipal assoc.: Kirchenthumbach

Government
  - Mayor (2020–26): Johannes Schmid

Area
  - Total: 20.35 km^{2} (7.86 sq mi)
- Elevation: 449 m (1,473 ft)

Population (2025-12-31)
  - Total: 864
  - Density: 42.5/km^{2} (110/sq mi)
- Time zone: UTC+01:00 (CET)
  - Summer (DST): UTC+02:00 (CEST)
- Postal codes: 95519
- Dialling codes: 09205
- Vehicle registration: NEW
- Website: www.schlammersdorf.de

Schlammersdorf is a municipality in the district of Neustadt an der Waldnaab in Bavaria, Germany.

== People ==
- Petra Dettenhöfer, politician (* 1957) (CSU), since 2008 member of the Landtag of Bavaria
