= Petrina (given name) =

Petrina is a feminine given name.

== List of people with the given name ==
- Petrina Fung (born 1954), Malaysian-born Chinese actress in Hong Kong
- Petrina Haingura (born 1959), Namibian politician
- Petrina Holdsworth (born 1952), British barrister and politician
- Petrina Price (born 1984), Australian high jumper

== See also ==
- Petrina (disambiguation)
- Petrina (surname)
