= Petrina (surname) =

Petrina is a surname. Notable people with the surname include:

- Carlotta Petrina (1901–1997), American illustrator and printer
- Nicola Petrina (1861–1909), Italian politician
- Stipe Petrina (born 1954), Croatian politician

== See also ==
- Petrina (disambiguation)
- Petrina (given name)
