= Paul Grice (civil servant) =

Professor Sir Paul Edward Grice, FRSE, FAcSS (born 1961) has been a senior civil servant, educational administrator and is now a University Principal and Vice Chancellor. He was clerk and chief executive of the Scottish Parliament from 1999 to 2019. He has been Principal and Vice-Chancellor of Edinburgh's Queen Margaret University since 2019.

== Early life and education ==
Born in 1961, Grice attended Archbishop Holgate's School in York, leaving with six O-Levels. Initially interested in pursuing a career in construction, he studied for a national diploma in building at York College of Arts and Technology. He then decided to take a higher education course and enrolled at the University of Stirling; he graduated with a BSc in economics and environmental sciences in 1984.

== Career ==
=== Civil service ===
Grice joined HM Civil Service as a Fast Stream trainee in 1985, when he took up a position in the Department for Transport. Two years later, he moved to the Department for the Environment. In 1992, he transferred to the Scottish Office Environment Department. He was head of the Housing and Urban Regeneration Branch between then and 1995, when he was appointed head of management and change. He was appointed head of the Constitution Group in 1997, where he was involved in leadership roles relating to the legislation for and organisation of the 1997 Scottish devolution referendum. He was appointed Director of Implementation for the Scotland Bill in 1998 and was responsible for establishing the new Scottish Parliament's organisation.

In May 1999, when the new Scottish Parliament was first convened, Grice was appointed acting clerk and chief executive. In August 1999, the Scottish Parliament announced that Grice had been appointed clerk and chief executive for a term of five years, with a salary of £70,000; he had been selected from among 56 applicants for the positions. Grice remained in the offices until 2019, unelected.

=== Educational administration ===
Alongside his position in the Scottish Parliament, Grice was a member of the University of Stirling's court from 2006 to 2013. He was also a member of the Economic and Social Research Council between 2009 and 2015. In 2019, Grice was appointed Principal and Vice-chancellor of Edinburgh's Queen Margaret University.

== Honours and awards ==
Grice was knighted in the 2016 New Year Honours. He was elected a fellow of the Royal Society of Edinburgh (FRSE) in 2017. In 2021, he was also elected a fellow of the Academy of Social Sciences (FAcSS).
