= Petra Hajkova =

Professor of developmental epigenetics

Petra Hajkova (born 1973) FMedSci is a Professor of Developmental Epigenetics at the Imperial College London. She is also the Deputy Director of the MRC Laboratory of Medical Sciences, where her research group Reprogramming and Chromatin is also hosted.

== Education ==
Petra Hajkova completed her Masters at the Charles University in Prague, and obtained her PhD at the Max Planck Institute for Molecular Genetics in Berlin.

== Academic career ==
After the completion of her PhD, Petra Hajkova worked as a postdoctoral researcher at the Gurdon Institute in Cambridge. Since 2009, she leads her own research group at the MRC Laboratory of Medical Sciences in London, working on epigenetics and reprogramming.

Hajkova is an elected EMBO member since 2018, a Fellow of the Academy of Medical Sciences since 2022, and a member of the Board of Trustees of Babraham Institute since 2023. She has been a member of several editorial boards of academic journals, including Stem Cells Reviews and Reports and PLOS Biology.

== Research ==
Hajkova's research group is working on epigenetic memory and reprogramming during mouse development. They have published seminal work on the molecular mechanisms that underlie the maintenance of epigenetic information using in vivo models.

== Awards and distinctions ==
- 2024: Cheryll Tickle Medal from the British Society for Developmental Biology.
- 2017: Mary Lyon Medal
- 2015: ERC consolidator Grant
- 2013: EMBO Young Investigator

== Publications (selection) ==
- Huang, TC., Wang, YF., Vazquez-Ferrer, E. et al. Sex-specific chromatin remodelling safeguards transcription in germ cells. Nature 600, 737–742 (2021). Sex-specific chromatin remodelling safeguards transcription in germ cells
- Hill, P., Leitch, H., Requena, C. et al. Epigenetic reprogramming enables the transition from primordial germ cell to gonocyte. Nature 555, 392–396 (2018). Epigenetic reprogramming enables the transition from primordial germ cell to gonocyte
- Amouroux, R., Nashun, B., Shirane, K. et al. De novo DNA methylation drives 5hmC accumulation in mouse zygotes. Nat Cell Biol 18, 225–233 (2016). De novo DNA methylation drives 5hmC accumulation in mouse zygotes
