= Purple Schulz =

German pop singer (born 1956)

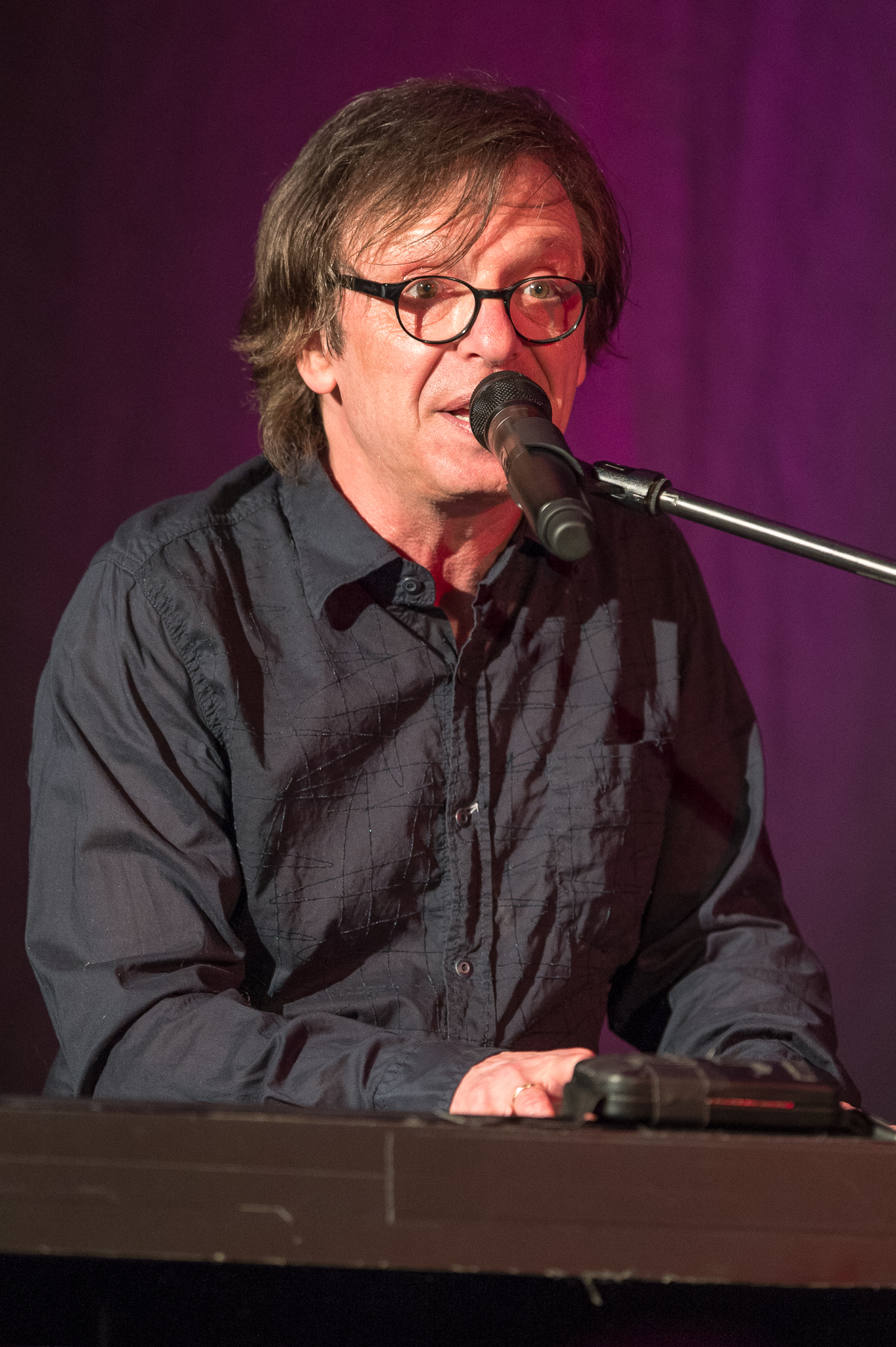
Purple Schulz in 2015

Karl Rüdiger "Purple" Schulz (born 25 September 1956 in Cologne) is a German pop singer. The nickname "Purple" came from covering Deep Purple tunes as a 13-year-old. He had his greatest successes in the 1980s. Some of Purple Schulz's songs are noted for highbrow literary references; his „Sehnsucht“ of 1983 cites the poet Eichendorff's „Sehnsucht.“

== Discography (albums) ==
- Die Härte – 1982 (as Neue Heimat)
- Hautnah – 1983 (as Neue Heimat, and Purple Schulz und die Neue Heimat)
- Verliebte Jungs – 1985
- Der Stand der Dinge – 1987
- ['tsvai] – 1988
- Purple Schulz – 1990
- haha – 1992
- Die Singles 84 – 92
- Spass beiseite? – 1994
- POP – 1997
- Sehnsucht (Die Balladen 1984–1999) – 1999
- Programmänderung – 2003
- Stunksitzung 2004/2005
- So und nicht anders - 2012
- So ist das live! - 2013
- Der Sing des Lebens - 2017
- Nach wie vor - 2019
