= Petra Häkkinen =

Finnish footballer (born 1979)

Personal information
- Date of birth: 31 January 1979 (age 47)
- Place of birth: Helsinki, Finland
- Position: Goalkeeper

Senior career*
Years	Team	Apps	(Gls)
- HJK

International career
1997-2009	Finland	3	(0)
- * Club domestic league appearances and goals

Petra Häkkinen (born 01 January 1979) is a retired Finnish footballer. Lindstrom spent most of her career at HJK.

== Career ==
The highlight of Petra Häkkinen's career was winning the Finnish League in 2005 with HJK.

Since retiring Petra Häkkinen was hired as the head goalkeeping for the Finland women's national football team.

=== International career ===
Petra Häkkinen was part of the Finnish team at the 2009 European Championships.
