= Petra Cabrera =

Petra Cabrera may refer to:

- Petra Cabrera (model)
- Petra Cabrera (footballer)
