= Petra Kehl =

German scholar of the Middle Ages

Petra Kehl is a German scholar of the Middle Ages, specifically of the veneration of saints. Kehl's monograph (derived from her doctoral dissertation) Kult und Nachleben des hl. Bonifatius (1993) is one of two monographs on the veneration of Saint Boniface (the other is by Lutz von Padberg). Her study was praised by one reviewer as written "with meticulous care", and by another as "an account that deserves wide recognition (and translation into English), a standard for scholarship for years to come". Kehl lives in Fulda, where she runs a publishing company specializing in historical fiction, religious literature, and children's literature.

== Bibliography ==
- Kehl, Petra (1993). Kult und Nachleben des heiligen Bonifatius im Mittelalter (754-1200) [Cult and Legacy of Saint Boniface in the Middle Ages (754–1200)]. Quellen und Abhandlungen zur Geschichte der Abtei und der Diözese Fulda. Vol. 26. Fulda: Parzeller. ISBN 978-3-790002263.
- Kehl, Petra (1995). "Heiligenverehrung in der Reichsabtei Fulda" [Veneration of the Saints in the Fulda Imperial Abbey]. In Heinemeyer, Walter (ed.). Fulda in seiner Geschichte. Landschaft, Reichsabtei, Stadt [Fulda throughout its History: Area, Imperial Abbey, City]. Marburg: Elwert. pp. 181–199. ISBN 3-7708-1043-0.
