= Petra Klinge =

Neurosurgeon and academic

Petra Klinge is a neurosurgeon and academic. She is professor of neurosurgery at Brown University.

== Education and training ==
Klinge earned her medical degree from the University of Kiel in 1993. She conducted her neurosurgical residency at Hannover Medical School in Germany, completing it in 2002. The same year, she earned her habilitation and postdoctoral qualification "venia legendi".

== Career ==
Klinge was senior associate professor of neurosurgery at the International Neuroscience Institute in Hannover, Germany until 2009, when she became attending neurosurgeon and associate professor at Brown University. She specializes in treating brain tumors, hydrocephalus and Alzheimer's disease, pediatric diseases, and congenital diseases like Chiari malformation and spinal malformations.

She is editor in chief of the medical journal Interdisciplinary Neurosurgery: Advanced Techniques and Case Management, a journal launched by Elsevier in 2013.

== Selected publications ==
- Klinge, P.; Hellström, P.; Tans, J.; Wikkelsø, C.; On behalf of the European iNPH Multicentre Study Group (2012). "One-year outcome in the European multicentre study on iNPH". Acta Neurologica Scandinavica. 126 (3): 145–153. doi:10.1111/j.1600-0404.2012.01676.x. PMID 22571428. S2CID 46300301.
- Relkin, Norman; Marmarou, Anthony; Klinge, Petra; Bergsneider, Marvin; Black, Peter McL. (1 September 2005). "Diagnosing Idiopathic Normal-pressure Hydrocephalus". Neurosurgery. 57 (suppl_3): S2–4-S2-16. doi:10.1227/01.NEU.0000168185.29659.C5. PMID 16160425. S2CID 6104866.
- Klinge, Petra; Marmarou, Anthony; Bergsneider, Marvin; Relkin, Norman; Black, Peter McL. (1 September 2005). "Outcome of Shunting in Idiopathic Normal-pressure Hydrocephalus and the Value of Outcome Assessment in Shunted Patients". Neurosurgery. 57 (suppl_3): S2–40–S2-52. doi:10.1227/01.NEU.0000168187.01077.2F. ISSN 0148-396X. PMID 16160428. S2CID 1833387.
- Johanson, Conrad E.; Duncan, John A.; Klinge, Petra M.; Brinker, Thomas; Stopa, Edward G.; Silverberg, Gerald D. (14 May 2008). "Multiplicity of cerebrospinal fluid functions: New challenges in health and disease". Cerebrospinal Fluid Research. 5 (1): 10. doi:10.1186/1743-8454-5-10. ISSN 1743-8454. PMC 2412840. PMID 18479516. S2CID 1038005.
