= Petra Allende =

Puerto Rican activist (1920–2002)

- Allende, 1944
- Born: Petra Allende y Rosario; June 29, 1920; Old San Juan, Puerto Rico
- Died: April 1, 2002 (aged 81); New York City, New York
- Other name: Petra Rosario Allende
- Occupations: domestic worker, factory worker, activist
- Years active: 1937–2001
- Children: 5

Petra Allende (June 29, 1920 – April 1, 2002) was a Puerto-Rican factory worker and clerk, who worked as an activist in New York City's El Barrio neighborhood. In the 1960s, she began working to overturn laws which required literacy to vote. In the 1970s, she campaigned for day care facilities for working mothers and adequate supports for the poor and in the 1980s turned her attention to elder rights. Affectionately known as "La Alcaldesa del Barrio" (The Mayor of the Barrio [Spanish Harlem]), the street on which she lived in Manhattan, East 111th Street, was renamed Petra Allende Way in 2012.

== Early life ==
Petra Allende-Rosario was born on June 29, 1920, in Old San Juan, Puerto Rico, to Alejandrina Rosario and Justo Allende. Her mother was mulatto and worked as a laundress, while her father was Afro-Puerto Rican and was a dock worker. Her mother's parents were Narcisa Coto and Demetrio Rosario and her father's parents were Saturnina Rivera and Cirilo Allende. One of five children, she completed 8 years of schooling before marrying Santos Garay on May 24, 1937. The couple had a son, Juan, and made their home with Garay's family in Fajardo, where Allende worked as a domestic. The marriage was unsuccessful. Allende returned to her parents' home with her son and she obtained a divorce. She would later have a second son, Felipe, with Felipe Ventegeat, though the couple did not marry.

== Career and activism ==
After the senior Ventegea died in 1948, Allende received the promise of a job in New York City. In 1949, she took her youngest son, leaving her older child, who was ill, and migrated north. When she arrived, the job had been filled, leaving her alone in a place where she did not speak the language. Despite the difficulties, Allende found work in a garment factory and was soon joined by her older son. She spent several years making clothing and then worked as a clerk at Barco Press. During that time, she had a relationship with Pedro Rivera, with whom she had two more children, Alexandra and Pedro Rivera. She also was mother to Rivera's son by a former partner, Felipe Ortiz, and raised a godson Miguel Maldonado.

In 1964, Allende became involved in community activism, first working to abolish literacy tests, which were used to suppress minority voters and organizing English classes. She participated in the Puerto Rican Community Development Project, which worked to alleviate poverty in El Barrio, and was one of the founders of the Puerto Rican Leadership Alliance. She also joined the women's affiliate of the Latino Odd Fellows fraternity of Spanish Harlem, which worked to provide support to orphans and widows. In 1966, Allende began working for the city in the human resources department of the Manpower Career Development Agency, later the New York City Department of Employment.

In the 1970s, Allende became a member of the Manhattan Political Caucus, learning how to lobby effectively by joining forces with other communities with similar needs. She and African-American women recognized the need for adequate day care for working women, joining forces in their efforts. She served as an advisor for the federal anti-poverty programs, and as the head of the East Harlem Multiservice Center Committee, lobbied the government of New York City to consolidate available services in a central location to facilitate the ease of coordination for those in need. From 1982, she turned her attention to working for the rights of elders and specifically those from minority communities with limited income. She served on the Action Council for Elderly Persons of the Puerto Rican and Hispanic Council, the East Harlem Interagency Council, the New York Advisory Committee to the Older Americans Act, the New York City Committee of the Department of Aging, and did volunteer work at the Gaylord White Senior Citizen Center.

In 1995, Allende represented the State of New York at the National Conference on the Aging, which advised in the development of federal changes to acts effecting senior citizens. She continued her activism and volunteering up until her death. Allende was honored by many organizations over the course of her career. She was known as the "La Alcaldesa del Barrio" (The Mayor of the Barrio [Spanish Harlem]). Of all the honors received during her lifetime, she cherished the recognition from the National Latinas Caucus. In 1998, she was given the New York State Certificate of Merit, as well as a certificate of appreciation from the National Silver Haired Congress. The New York City Council honored her with the Woman of Achievement Pacesetter Award in 2001 for International Women's Day.

== Death and legacy ==
Allende died on April 1, 2002, in New York City, New York. Her papers are housed at the Center for the Study of Puerto Ricans at Hunter College in New York. In 2012, East 111th Street in Manhattan, on which she had lived was renamed Petra Allende Way in her honor.
