= Petra Dettenhöfer =

German politician

Petra Dettenhöfer (born 4 July 1957 in Schlammersdorf) is a German politician, representative of the Christian Social Union of Bavaria. Since 2008 she has been a member of the Landtag of Bavaria (Bayerischer Landtag)

== See also ==
- List of Bavarian Christian Social Union politicians
