= Petra Döll =

German hydrologist

Petra Döll is a German hydrologist whose research focuses on global water resources and methods for transdisciplinary knowledge integration. She is a professor of hydrology at the Institute of Physical Geography, Goethe University Frankfurt.

== Life, education and career ==
Being born and raised in Hof, Germany, Petra Döll worked for one year as a secretary at the Honorary Consulate of Germany in San Sebastián, Spain, before studying geology at the University of Erlangen, Germany. With the help of a scholarship, she continued her studies at the University of Colorado, Boulder, USA, where she focused on geohydrology and mathematical modeling as she was interested in contributing to sustainability. In 1987, she earned a Master of Science in Geology from this university. After five years of groundwater modeling at the Geological Survey of Hamburg, she continued her work at Technische Universität Berlin, modeling moisture movement in the unsaturated zone under the influence of temperature gradients as it pertains to the desiccation of mineral liners beneath landfills, and obtained her PhD in 1996. Afterward, Döll began her research on global and regional modeling of water availability and use at the University of Kassel and earned her habilitation in Environmental Systems Analysis in 2002. Since 2003, she has been a professor of hydrology at the Institute of Physical Geography, Goethe University Frankfurt. She is married and has two children, born in 2000 and 2004.

== Research ==
Döll is recognized for modeling the global freshwater system, in particular for quantifying human impacts on groundwater, streamflow and wetlands. The WaterGAP model, in continuous development since 1996, quantifies water resources and human water use on all land areas of the globe. To obtain the required input for the model, Döll and her team generated data sets such as a global map of irrigated areas, together with the Food and Agriculture Organization of the UN, a global drainage direction map and a global dataset of lakes, reservoirs and wetlands. WaterGAP serves to quantify the global-scale impacts of climate change, human water use and artificial reservoirs, assessing water stress for both humans and freshwater biota. It is one of the global hydrological models that regularly participate in the multi-model simulation rounds coordinated by the Inter-Sectoral Impact Model Intercomparison Project.

In support of the sustainable management of social-ecological systems, mainly water management, Döll and her team investigate methods for conducting transdisciplinary research that integrated multi-disciplinary scientists and multi-sectoral stakeholders and the design of participatory processes. These methods include the elicitation of the problem perspective of individual stakeholders by perception graphs, joint development of causal networks, the participatory development of scenarios and participatory modeling methods such as Bayesian networks. Her special interest are methods for supporting climate change adaptation under uncertainty.

== Other contributions ==
Since 2001, Döll has contributed to reports for the Intergovernmental Panel on Climate Change (IPCC) both as a lead author and contributing author on chapters about freshwater resources and their management. Döll was a contributing author of the freshwater resources chapter of the Third Assessment Report: Climate Change 2001. She became a lead author of the freshwater resources chapter of the Fourth Assessment Report: Climate Change 2007. In 2008 she was lead author of the IPCC's Technical Paper on Climate and Water. Consequently, Döll served again as lead author of the freshwater resources chapter of the Fifth Assessment Report: Climate Change 2014 and co-authored the Summary for Policymakers of the Working Group II. She was later a contributing author of a Working Group I chapter on the water cycle in the Sixth Assessment Report: Climate Change 2021.

Döll served as a member of the “Senate Commission on Earth System Research" of the German Research Foundation (DFG) throughout its lifetime from 2016 to 2023.

At the Faculty of Geosciences/Geography of Goethe University, Döll has acted as chair of the Commission for Gender Equality and Diversity since 2005. In various programs, she served as a mentor for young women working in the natural sciences. In addition, she has been a Vertrauensdozentin (personal tutor) of students with scholarships from the Studienstiftung des deutschen Volkes since 2010.

== Awards ==
In 2019, Döll was awarded the Henry Darcy Medal of the European Geophysical Union for her work in global freshwater system modeling, raising awareness about threats to freshwater security, and advocating for and researching participatory water management. In 2022, she was awarded the Deutscher Hydrologiepreis (German Hydrology Award) by the Deutsche Hydrologische Gesellschaft (German Hydrological Society) for significantly shaping hydrology in Germany through her many years of commitment to hydrological research and teaching as well as her outstanding research results. Before, she had received the following awards: in 1997 the Fritz Scheffer Award of Deutsche Bodenkundliche Gesellschaft (for her PhD thesis), in 2005 the Best Paper 2004 Award of Water International, and in 2006 the eLearning Award of Goethe University.

== Publications ==
As of May 2024, Döll has authored 129 peer-reviewed publications, which have been cited more than 30,000 times. In the years 2018 to 2022, she was counted among the top 1% of most highly cited researchers in the category cross-field according to Clarivate Analytics.
