= Petrine =

Petrine may refer to:

- Saint Peter the Apostle, in Christianity, as in a Petrine text
  - Petrine Cross
  - Petrine ministry, the office of the Pope
- Peter the Great, in Russia, as in the Petrine Revolution
  - The post-Petrine era, the House of Romanov after Peter the Great, or the Holstein-Gottorp-Romanov Dynasty
- Petrine Baroque, a style of architecture, particularly rich in Saint Petersburg
- Petrine (Fire Emblem: Path of Radiance), in Fire Emblem: Path of Radiance, one of the Four Riders of Daein and one of the game's more prominent adversaries
