= Petra Wend =

British academic

Professor Petra Wend CBE, FRSA, FRSE was Principal and Vice-Chancellor of Edinburgh's Queen Margaret University from 2009 until her retirement in 2019.

== Academic life ==
Petra Wend studied Italian and French Language and Education at the University of Münster in Germany. In 1990 she completed a PhD in Italian Language and Literature at University of Leeds. The title of her thesis was "The Female Voice: Lyrical Expression in the Writings of five Italian Renaissance Poets".

Petra Wend joined Queen Margaret University in 2009 as Principal and Vice-Chancellor and retired in 2019.

Prior to joining Queen Margaret University she was Deputy Vice-Chancellor (Academic) and Deputy Chief Executive at Oxford Brookes University.

During her time at Queen Margaret, Petra served as Vice-Convener of Universities Scotland in 2012–2014 and 2014–2016. In 2015 she was appointed by the Scottish Government as a member of the Commission for Widening Access chaired by Dame Ruth Silver. Petra was then appointed by Universities Scotland in 2017 to lead the work stream on Bridging Programmes.

In 2020 Professor Wend was appointed as an external expert to the programme board for the Scottish Funding Council’s review of Further Education and Higher Education. In 2020, she was elected Chair of the University Council of the University of Hamburg.

== Recognition and honours ==
- Petra Wend was appointed a Fellow of the Royal Society of Edinburgh in 2015.
- She was made Commander of the Order of the British Empire in the 2021 New Year Honours.
