= Petra Pascal =

German presenter and singer (born 1934)

Petra Pascal (born December 21, 1934, in Frankfurt am Main) is a German chanson singer and radio presenter.

== Life ==
After grammar school, Petra Pascal became a social insurance social insurances clerk at the Hesse State Insurance Institution (now Deutsche Rentenversicherung Hessen). She then studied singing for six years and took music and ballet lessons. She took part in five international festivals and released several single records in the 1960s, initially under the stage name Mariett Sora, including Wenn Du gehst, mon ami and Ohne dich together with Hubert Wolf.

In 1969, Pascal's first long-playing record, Kontraste, was released. At the beginning of the 1970s, she had some commercial success with chanson-like songs, which were also played in the hit parades. Her greatest successes were Das war ein Leben, Raskolnikoff (1969), Wie das Glas in meiner Hand (1971), Drei Schritte vor und zwei zurück (1972) and Ich bin ein Morgenmuffel (1979). Noteworthy was her concept album Das Paradies ist noch nicht verloren (1974), on which she dealt with environmental protection and pollution and their consequences in 14 songs. The patron of the work was the then Federal Minister of the Interior, Hans-Dietrich Genscher, who also wrote the foreword on the back of the LP cover.

From the 1980s onwards, Pascal worked primarily as a radio presenter and author. Her programs included: portraits of composers and artists on HR 4, the ARD-Nachtxpress of HR and from 1991 on WDR 4 the program Café Carlton, which was discontinued at the end of 2006 after a program reform, and the Schellack-Schätzchen, which she presented several times a year until the beginning of 2012.

== Awards ==
- Goldene Europa 1969
- Honorary Award of the Federal Ministry of the Interior for Environmental Protection LP 1974
- EnvironmentalMedal of the Bavarian State Ministry 1974

== Successful titles ==
- Drei Schritte vor und zwei zurück 1972
- Ich bin ein Morgenmuffel 1979
- Das war ein Leben 1969
- So war Ivan 1970
- Wie das Glas in meiner Hand 1971
- Wie schön ist doch mein Dorf gewesen 1979
- Morgens um sieben ist die Welt noch in Ordnung 1974
- Zugeben 1979

== Discography ==
Petra Pascal has released twelve albums in her career, two CDs and 20 singles, among others:

== Singles ==
- 1965: Wenn du gehst, mon ami / Ohne dich

=== Studio albums ===
- 1969: Kontraste
- 1970: Petra Pascal
- 1971: Wenn der Abendwind durch die Taiga weht
- 1971: Like the glass in my hand
- 1972: I am a woman
- 1974: Paradise is not yet lost
- 1975: The Two Sides of Michael "M"
- 1979: Admitted
- 1985: Das Schachspiel unsres Lebens

=== Compilations ===
- 1973: Treffpunkt Stars
- 1974: Portrait eines Stars
- 1993: Die großen Erfolge
- 2004: Wie das Glas in meiner Hand – Kontraste (Leico music)
- 2008: Ich bin eine Frau – Kontraste II (Leico music)
- 2009: Frohsein ist kein Risiko – Kontraste III (Leico music)
