= Petrina =

Petrina may refer to:

- Petrina, Arcadia, a village in Arcadia, Greece
- Petrina, Laconia, a village in the Sminos municipal unit, Laconia, Greece
- Petrina, Kostel, a village near Kostel
- Petrina (surname)
- Petrina (given name)
- 482 Petrina, an asteroid
