= Petra Scharbach =

German model and artist

Petra Scharbach (born 21 October 1962), also known just as Petra, is a German actress, model, singer and painter. She was sometimes credited as Petra Rockstar.

Born in Frankfurt, at 6 moved to Parma with her mother. In Italy, after having participated and won several beauty contests and worked as a model in local fashion shows, debuted in the mid-eighties as singer and softcore actress. In the same period she appeared on the cover of Playmen and of the French edition of Penthouse.

Then she worked for several years with the Riccardo Schicchi's agency Diva Futura and was the main actress in several softcore movies. After some years she left Rome and returned to Parma to host a sport program in TV Parma. During these years she was a protagonist of gossip columns for her relations with Colombian footballer Faustino Asprilla and American actor American actor Tony Curtis.

In the early 2000s she began a career as a body art painter.
