= Petra Lewis =

Professor of Radiology and Obstetrics

Professor Petra Lewis
- Education: Guy's Hospital
- Years active: 1987 - present
- Medical career
- Institutions: Geisel School of Medicine; Dartmouth College; Johns Hopkins University
- Sub-specialties: Radiology; Obstetrics
- Research: Radiology education Women's health

Petra Lewis is a Professor of Radiology and Obstetrics at Dartmouth College. She is a leader in radiology education.

== Early life and education ==
Lewis studied medicine at Guy's Hospital, where she graduated with a Bachelor of Medicine, Bachelor of Surgery in 1987. After graduating, she was awarded a fellowship in nuclear medicine at Johns Hopkins University.

== Career ==
After her fellowship, Lewis returned to London to work in one of the UK's first positron emission tomography centres. She studied the use of Fluorine-18-Fluorodeoxyglucose in Sarcoidosis. She joined Dartmouth–Hitchcock Medical Center as a radiology resident. In 1998 she was appointed to the faculty at the Geisel School of Medicine, where she has since served as director of electives for radiology. She has developed 11 online resources for education that are used across the United States, including the Case-based On-Line Radiology Education (CORE) and Radiology ExamWeb. Alongside developing resources and her popular YouTube channel, Lewis is involved in the development of the national curriculum for radiology. In 2006 she began to edit and write questions for the American Board of Radiology.

Lewis co-edited the Oxford American Handbook of Radiology in 2013. She has served as director of medical student education and vice-chair for education. In 2017 she developed a web-based platform to recognise scholarly and service activity of faculty. In 2017 she launched RadExam, a tool to allow evaluation and feedback of residents at the end of a radiology rotation.

Lewis' clinical interests include nuclear medicine and women's imaging. Her clinical practise is based as Dartmouth–Hitchcock Medical Center. She has explored the use of breast magnetic resonance imaging in the evaluation of patients who have been diagnosed with breast cancer.

=== Professional service ===
Lewis is a member of the Alliance of Medical Student Educators in Radiology (AMSER) and Alliance of Clinician Educators in Radiology (ACER). She has served as president in 2006 (AMSER) and 2012 (ACER). She received the AMSER Excellence in Education Award in 2013. She has served as vice chair of the American Board of Radiology's Nuclear Medicine Maintenance of Certification Committee. Lewis is president elect of the Association of University Radiologists, and was presented with their education award in 2017. She was awarded the Association of Program Directors in Radiology Achievement Award in 2017.
