= Petra Guttenberger =

German politician (born 1962)

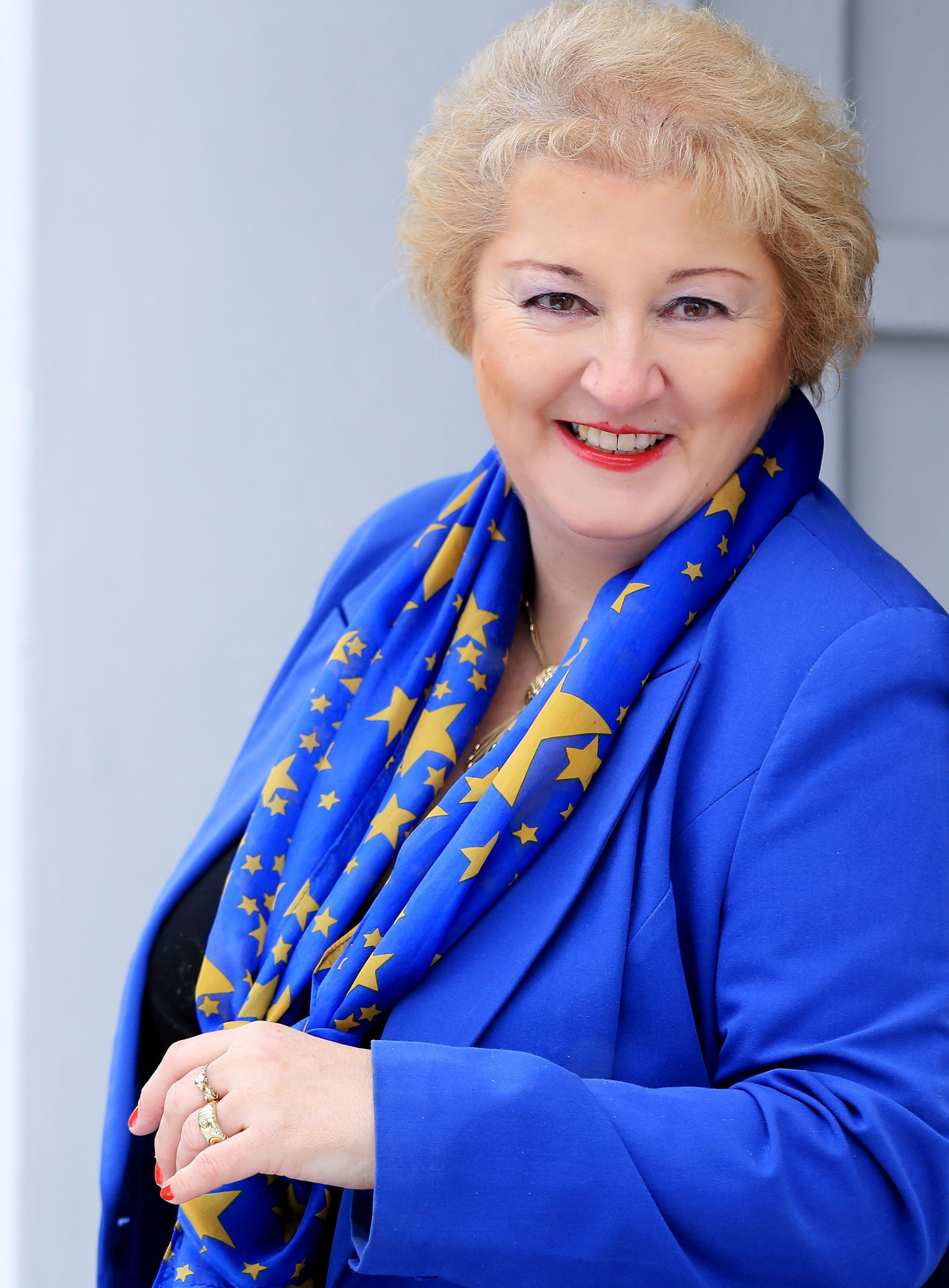
- Guttenberger in 2017

Member of the Landtag of Bavaria
- Incumbent
- Assumed office 28 September 1998
- Constituency: Middle Franconia (1998–2003); Fürth (2003–present)

Personal details
- Born: 28 March 1962 (age 64) Nürnberg
- Party: Christian Social Union (since 1980)

Petra Lucia Guttenberger (born 28 March 1962 in Nürnberg) is a German politician serving as a member of the Landtag of Bavaria since 1998. She has served as chairwoman of the committee on constitutional, legal and parliamentary affairs and integration since 2018.
