= Petra Deimer =

German marine biologist (1948–2024)

- Born: 9 March 1948; Göttingen, Germany
- Died: 27 March 2024 (aged 76)
- Occupations: Marine biologist, journalist, activist, conservationist

Petra Deimer (9 March 1948, in Göttingen – 27 March 2024) was a German marine biologist, and nature conservationist who has been actively involved in the study and protection of marine mammals, particularly cetaceans, since the mid-1970s.

== Career ==
Deimer gained her PhD in marine biology, with a particular focus on sperm whales, at the University of Hamburg. In the late 1970s many species of whale, including sperm whales, were in danger of extinction. As a result of Deimer's actions, the archipelago of Madeira was declared a protection zone for marine mammals, and commercial whaling around Madeira ceased in 1981.

She contributed significantly to the decision of the International Whaling Commission (IWC) to ban commercial whaling in July 1982. In 1983 Deimer ensured that the trade in Minke whales was also banned.

Deimer is the founder and president of the Society for the Conservation of Marine Mammals (Gesellschaft zum Schutz der Meeressäugetiere; GSM). She is a member of the International Whaling Commission's (IWC) Scientific Committee, a member of the German government's Species Conservation Advisory Committee, and an advisor to the International Fund for Animal Welfare (IFAW).

In 2001, Deimer was awarded the Golden Ark for nature conservation by Prince Bernhard of the Netherlands.

Deimer has written six books, and numerous articles on whales, dolphins, and seals, as well as on environmental conservation more generally. She has also written a book on parrots.

== Select Bibliography ==
- Whales and Dolphins (1998) (English translation of: Wale und Delphine)
- Parrots: A complete pet owner’s manual (1984) (trans. Rita Kimber) (English translation of: Papageien)
- Das Buch der Wale (Hamburg, 1983) (The Book of Whales)
- Das Buch der Robben (Hamburg, 1987) (The Book of Seals)
