= International Fund for Animal Welfare =

Non-profit US organization

International Fund for Animal Welfare – ifaw
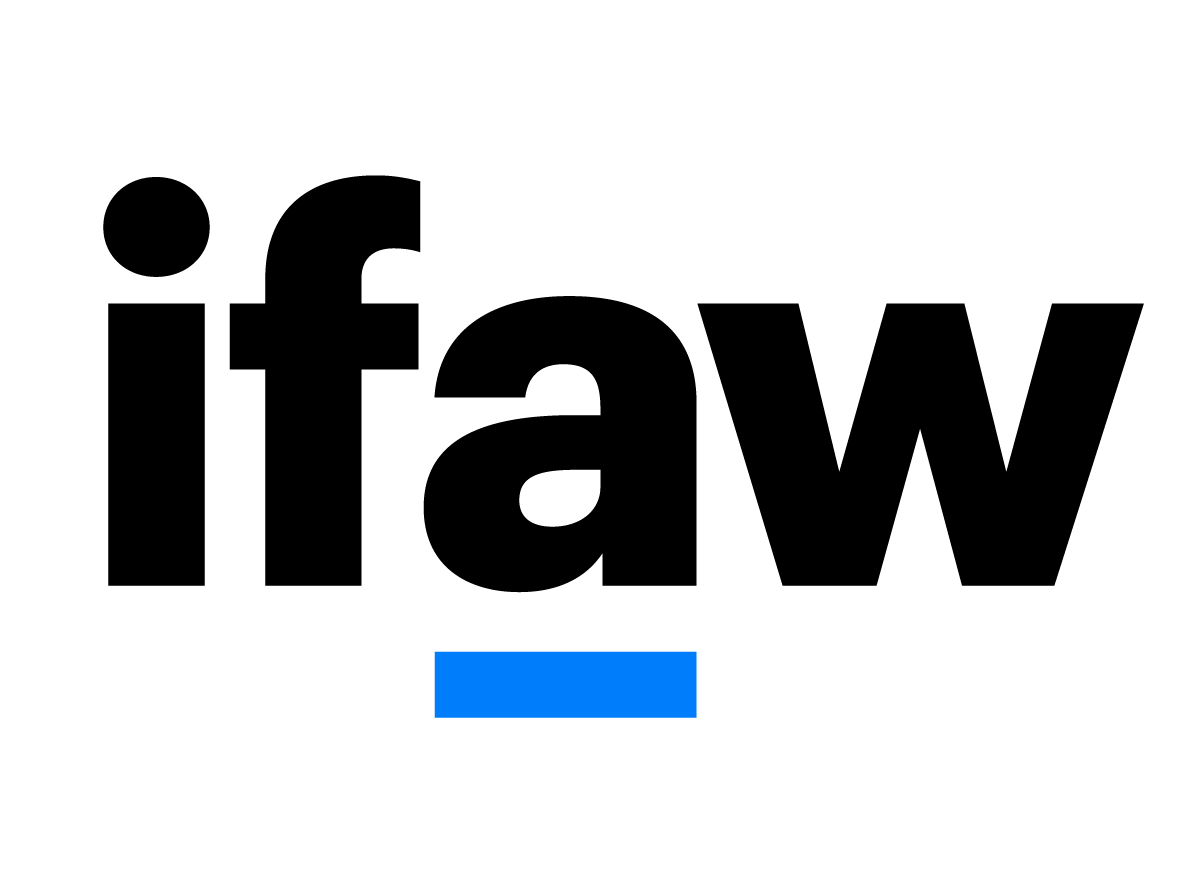
- Type: Non-profit Organization
- Industry: Animal welfare, conservation
- Founded: 1969, New Brunswick, Canada
- Headquarters: The Hague, Netherlands
- Key people: Azzedine Downes (CEO)
- Products: Landmark & framework legislation, research, activism.
- Revenue: $97,079,000 USD (2013 Annual Report)
- Total assets: 59,481,027 United States dollar (2022)
- Number of employees: 300+
- Website: ifaw.org

The International Fund for Animal Welfare (IFAW) is one of the largest animal welfare and conservation charities in the world. The organization works to rescue individual animals, safeguard populations, preserve habitat, and advocate for greater protections. Brian Davies founded IFAW. In 1983 Europe banned all whitecoat harp seals products. This ban helped save over 1 million seals. IFAW operates in over 40 countries.

== History ==
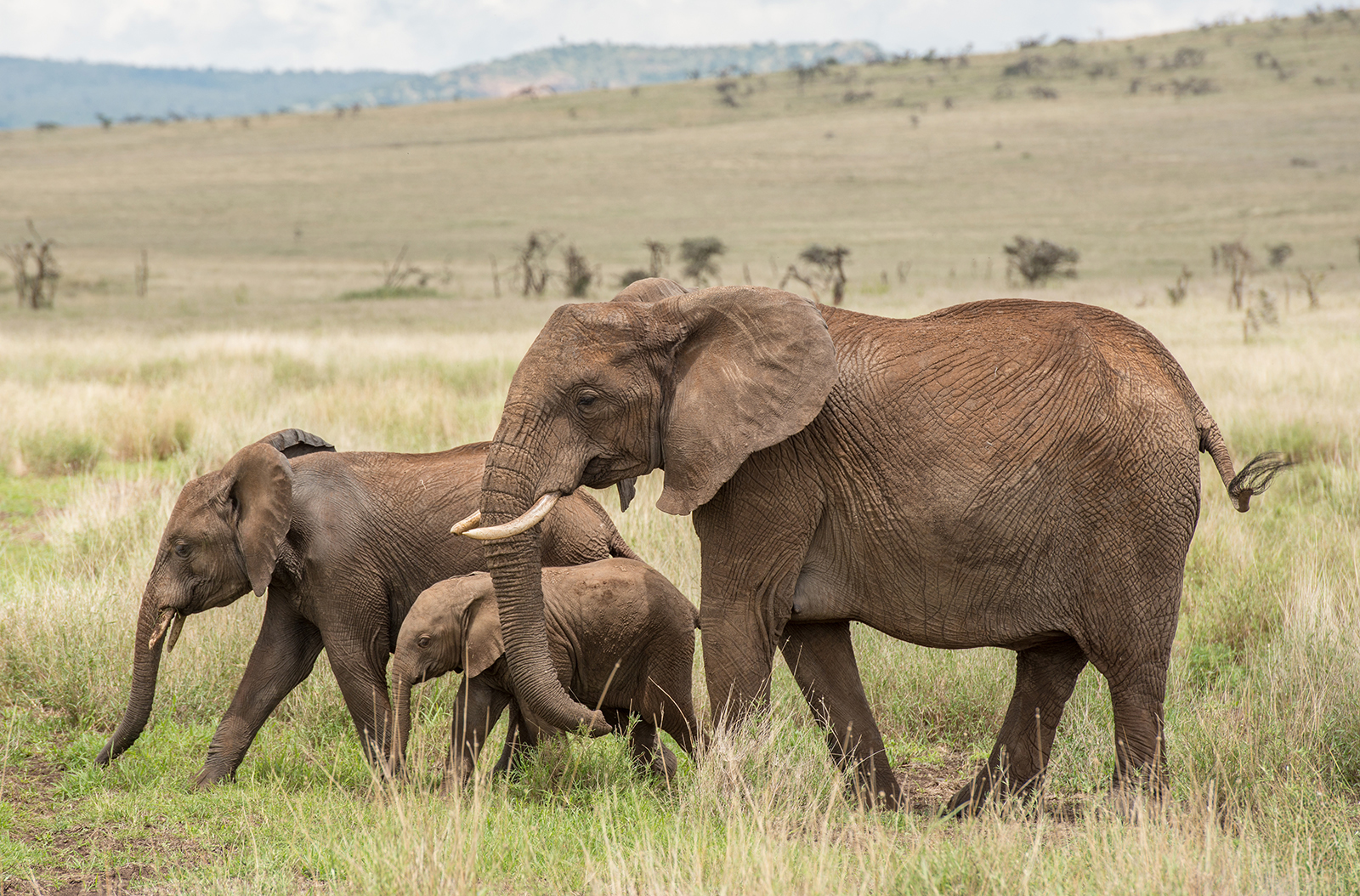
Elephants roaming in Kenya

The International Fund for Animal Welfare (IFAW) was founded in 1969, in initial efforts to stop the commercial hunt for seal pups on the east coast of Canada.

In 2014 it had offices in 15 countries, and projects in more than 40. IFAW is one of the largest animal welfare organisations.

The fund is supported by corporate donors including the Disneynature and the Disney Conservation Fund, the Petfinder Foundation and Arctic Fox.

In 2025, it was announced that villagers near Kasungu National Park were beginning legal action proceedings against IFAW, following the death of ten people after the NGO relocated 263 elephants to the area in 2022. According to Malawi locals, over fifty children were orphaned between July 2022 and November 2024 as a result of the translocated elephants. The prospective plaintiffs are demanding for IFAW to construct fencing to protect the 167 villages surrounding the park and to also compensate locals for any damages caused by the elephants.

In response to the allegations, which were orchestrated by a former IFAW employee, the charity rejected all allegations of wrongdoing.

In a statement to the Guardian IFAW said: "It is deeply saddened by all cases of human-wildlife conflict in and around Kasungu, where it has been working to support government and communities develop sustainable solutions for reducing human-wildlife conflict and promote coexistence,”.

It was also highlighted that Malawi’s government had overall responsibility for its national parks. IFAW provided technical and financial support, following international best practice while moving the elephants.

New regulations have been announced to protect gulper sharks. Gulper shark populations were declining from over fishing for their liver oil. Some gulper sharks faced a population decline of over 80% in some regions. Stronger protection regulations were also announced for over 70 shark and ray species.

== Activities ==
- IFAW partners with elephant and rhino orphanages in Zambia, Zimbabwe and India, where the focus is on rescue, rehabilitation, release, and post-release monitoring and protection.
- tenBoma is IFAW's counter-poaching initiative in Kenya, as featured on NBC's Sunday Night with Megyn Kelly and PBS NewsHour.
- tenBoma architect, IFAW Senior Vice President Lt Col Faye Cuevas, was honored as one of Motherboard's Humans of the Year in 2017.
- IFAW's Wildlife Crime program works to reduce demand for wildlife products, wildlife cybercrime and live animal exploitation and trafficking around the world.
- IFAW's Marine Mammal Rescue and Research group (MMRR) is a team of scientists, veterinarians and other individuals committed to promoting the conservation of marine mammal species (dolphins, whales, porpoises, and seals) and their habitats. Cape Cod is a hot spot for mass stranding activity, and the team is called on for expertise in global events as well.
- The Meet Us Don't Eat Us campaign aims to promote whale watching, as an alternative to whale hunting in Iceland.
- IFAW aims to protect the last 400 critically endangered North Atlantic right whales and has developed acoustic detection systems, collaborated with lobstermen, commercial fishers and shipping industries to prevent collisions with ships and gear entanglements; and advocated for greater legislation to protect the species.
- Through its DISRUPT wildlife crime prevention program, IFAW trains customs officers, game wardens and law enforcers in many countries to prevent the killing of endangered species.
- IFAW protects elephants by protecting critical elephant habitats, managing human-elephant conflict, preventing poaching, ending illegal ivory trade and rescuing orphan and injured elephants.
- Carrying out legislative and educational campaigns across the globe. This is an effort to try to prevent cruelty to animals, preserve endangered species, and protect wildlife habitats.

IFAW had campaigns to end the commercial seal hunt in Canada and end commercial whaling. It helps dogs and cats in impoverished communities, protects elephants, reduce illegal ivory trade, rescue and release of wild animals such as orphan rhinos and rescues animals in the wake of disasters such as Hurricane Katrina in the US.

== See also ==
- List of animal welfare organizations
- Petra Deimer, German marine biologist, nature conservationist, advisor to the fund
