= Fishmonger =

Profession of selling raw fish and seafood

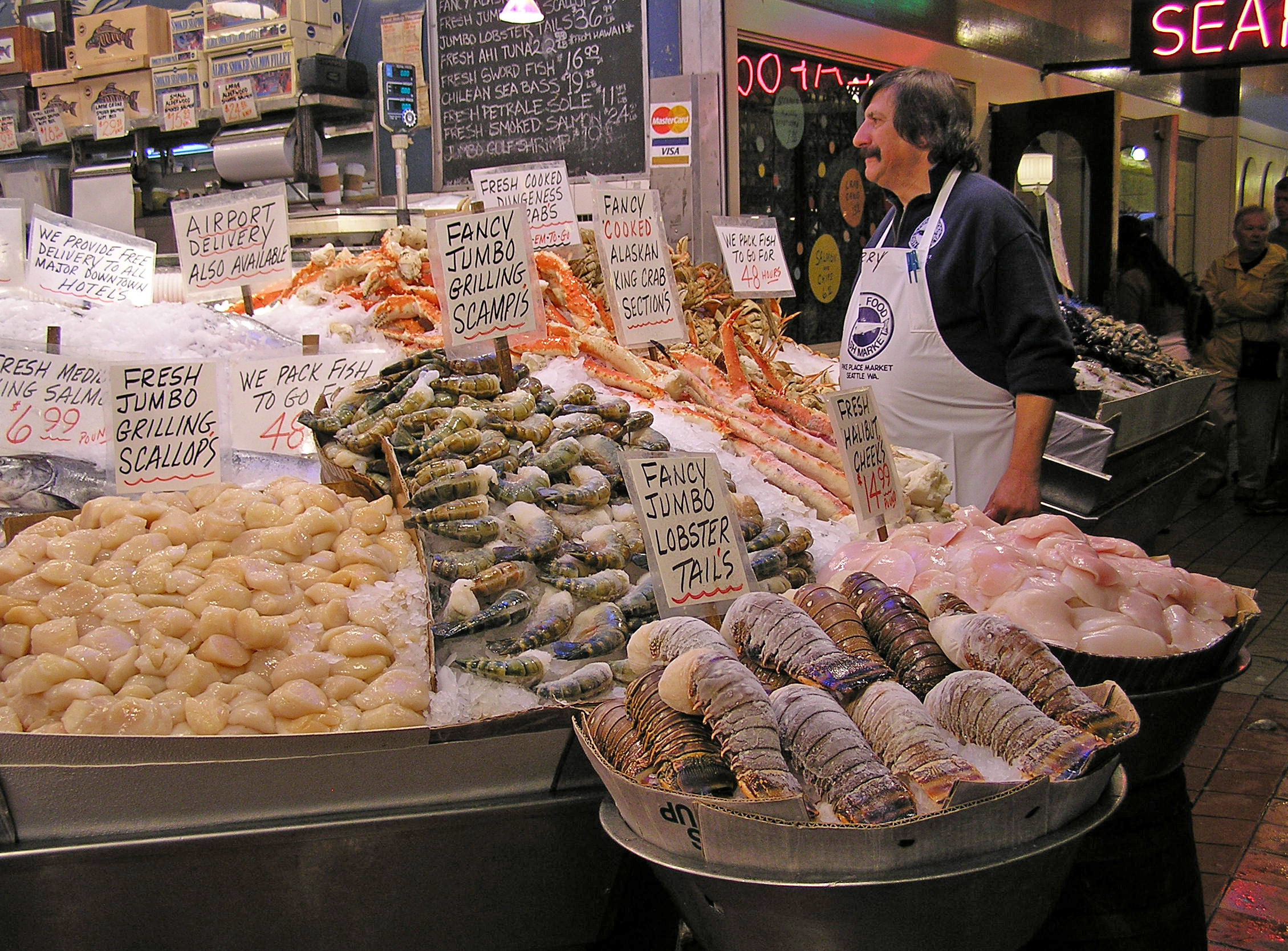
A fishmonger in Pike Place Market on the waterfront of Seattle.

A fishmonger (historically fishwife for female practitioners) is someone who sells raw fish and seafood. Fishmongers can be wholesalers or retailers, and are trained at selecting and purchasing, handling, gutting, boning, filleting, displaying, merchandising and selling their product. In some countries, modern supermarkets are replacing fishmongers who operate in shops or fish markets.

== Worshipful Company of Fishmongers ==
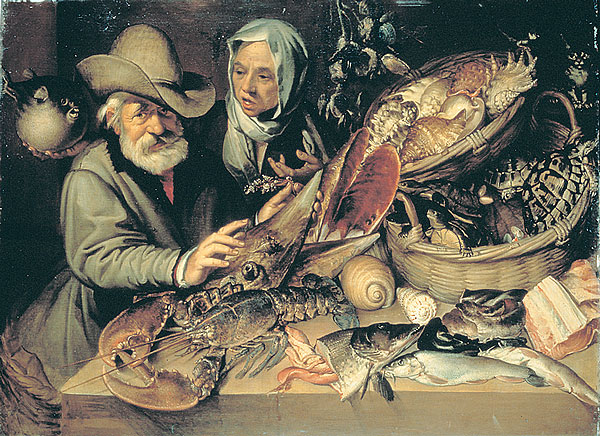
A 16th-century fishmongers stall. Bartolomeo Passarotti.

The fishmongers guild, one of the earliest guilds, was established in the City of London by a Royal Charter granted by Edward I shortly after he became king in 1272. Partnership with foreigners was forbidden and the sale of fish was tightly controlled to ensure freshness and restrain profit, which was limited to one penny in the shilling. Nevertheless, the guild grew rich and, after Edward's victory over the Scots, was able to make a great show, including one thousand mounted knights.

During the reign of Edward II, the political power of the fishmongers waned, and Parliament decreed that no fishmonger could become mayor of the city. This was soon rescinded, and their wealth increased further so that, during the reign of Edward III, the guild could provide £40 to the war against the French, this being a great sum at that time.

The guild was then reformed by Great Charter as the Mystery of the Fishmongers of London. They were given a monopoly over the buying and selling of fish, and they regulated the catching of fish in the Thames, which teemed with fish such as salmon at that time. The guild still continues today as one of the Great Twelve City Livery Companies.

== Tools ==
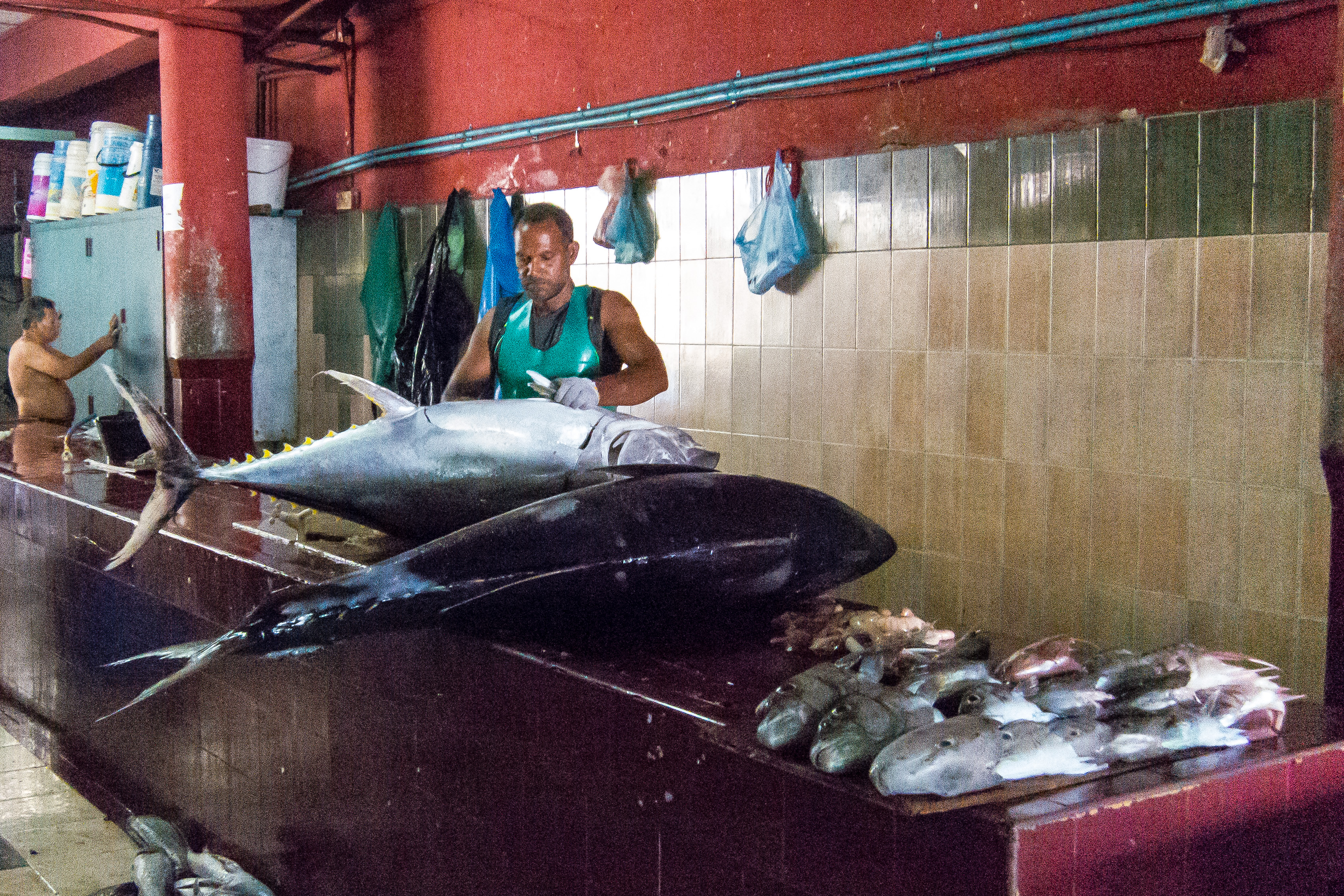
A fishmonger prepares to clean and butcher a pair of large fish in Malé.

The tools used by fishmongers include:

- Pliers to pull out pinbones
- A fish scaler to remove scales
- A filleting knife to cut away the flesh from the bones
- Short strong knives for opening oysters and other shellfish
- Protective gloves
- A curved knife for gutting and removing roe

== Fishmongers in culture ==
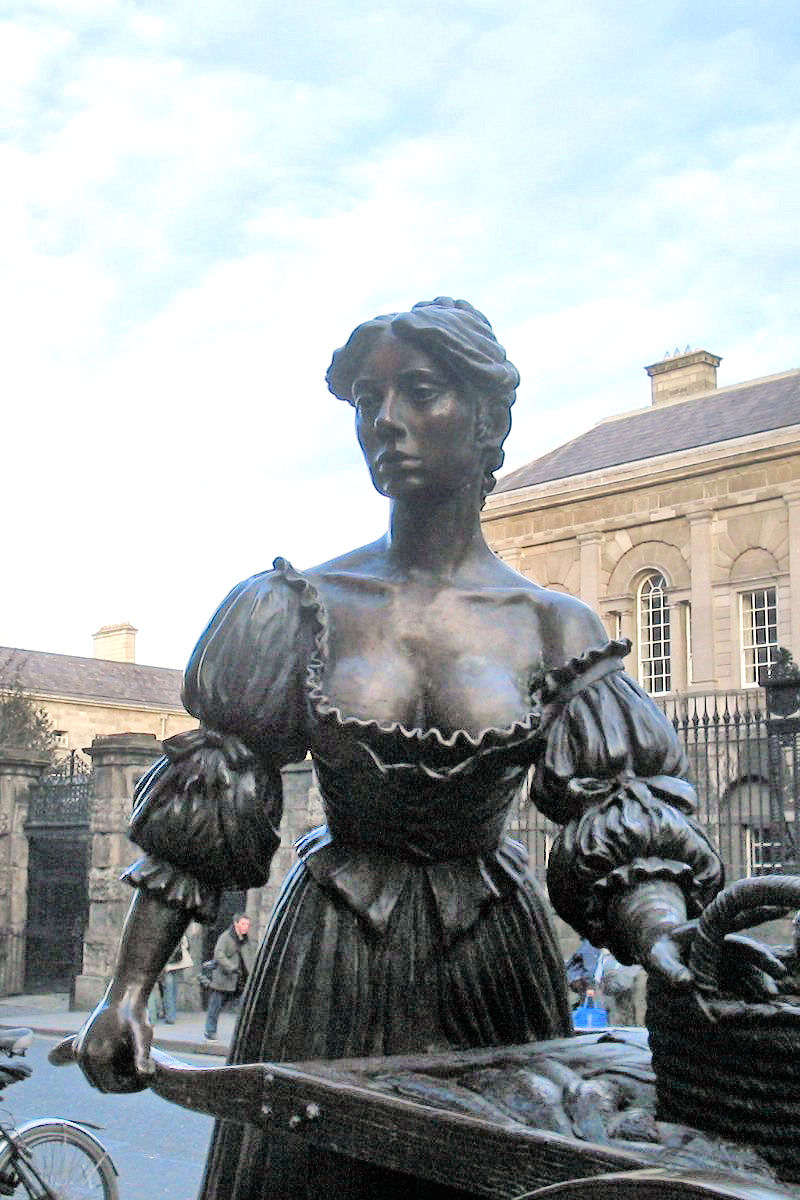
The fishwife Molly Malone of "Cockles and Mussels" fame.

In many countries, the fishwife was proverbial for her sharp tongue and outspokenness. In Medieval France, the ones in Paris were known for their special privilege of being able to speak frankly to the King himself, when he ventured into the marketplace, and voice criticism without fear of punishment.

Molly Malone is a character from a popular Irish song about a young fishwife who tragically dies at a young age.

Charles Fort in his book Lo! compiles the story of the Mad Fishmonger or "St. Fishmonger", which later may or may not appear in the Schrödinger's Cat Trilogy by Robert Anton Wilson. St. Fishmonger allegedly caused crabs and periwinkles to fall from the sky.

In the English translation of the Asterix series, the village fishmonger is called Unhygienix. In the film The Beach, the Island's chef has only fish as a source of meat, and is named Unhygienix in reference to the Asterix character.

In Shakespeare's Hamlet, some contend that the word fishmonger was a euphemism for a "fleshmonger," or pimp.

== Historic fishmongers ==
- Marretje Arents
- Dolly Peel
- Dolly Pentreath, the last native speaker of Cornish
- Bartolomeo Vanzetti, Italian anarchist executed in 1927 following a controversial American trial
- Jack Cullen, Irish fishmonger and tuba player

== Gallery ==
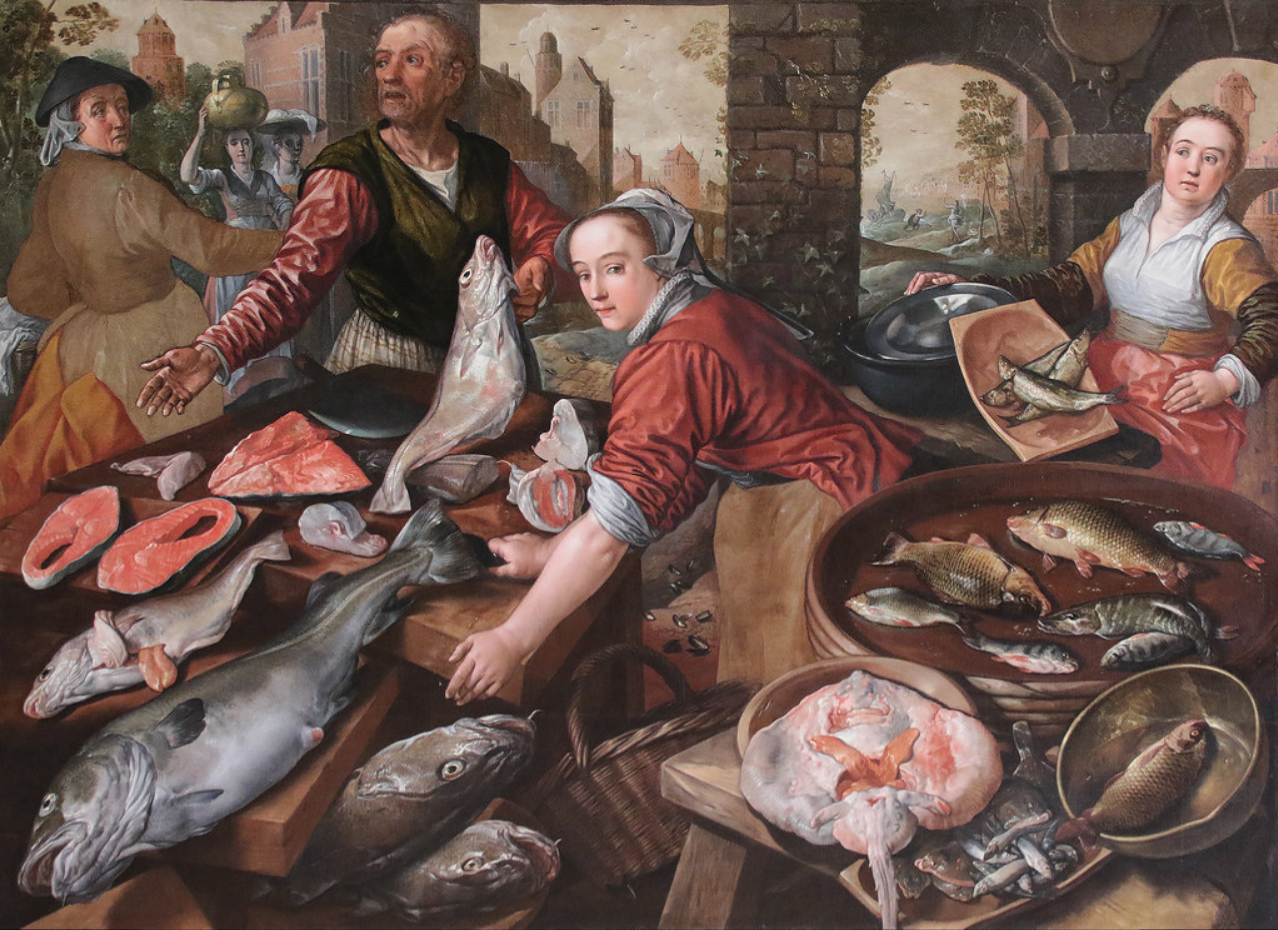
A 16th-century Flemish fishmonger painted by Joachim Beuckelaer.

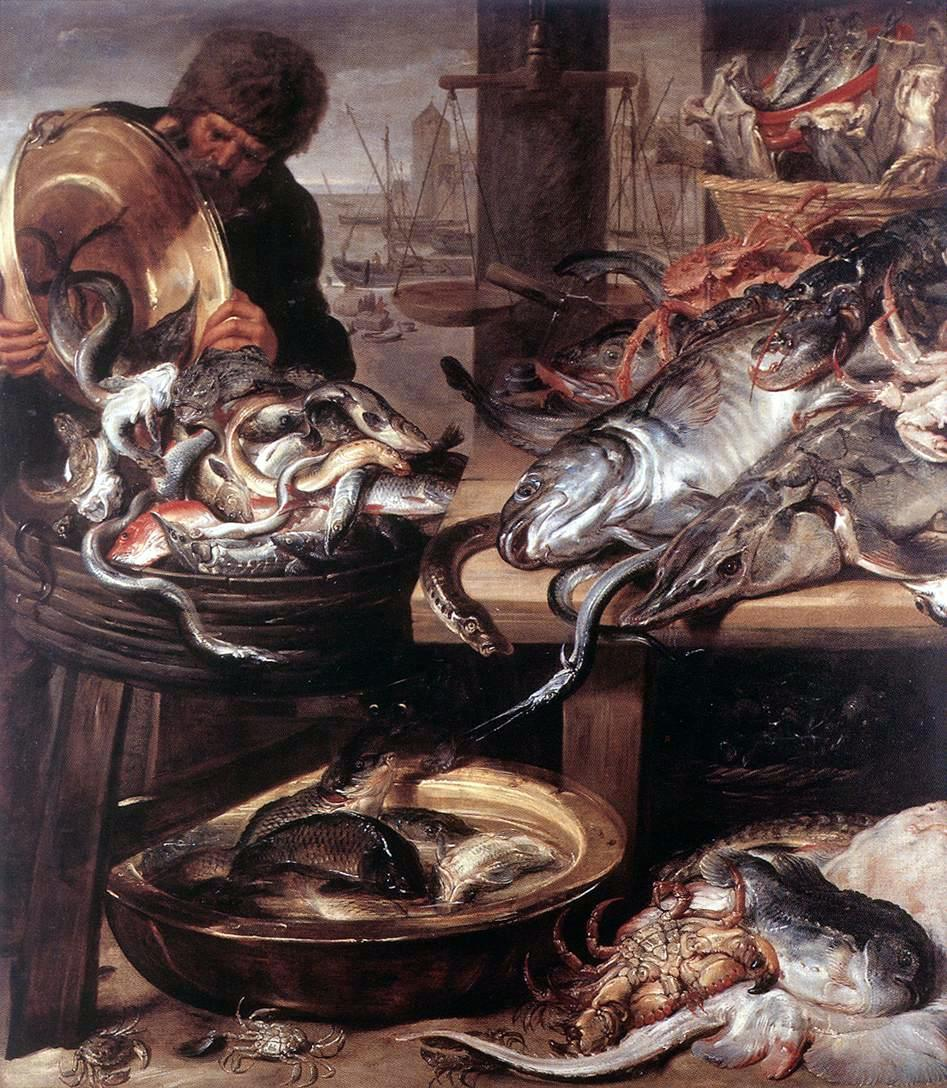
The Fishmonger. By Frans Snyders (1579–1657).

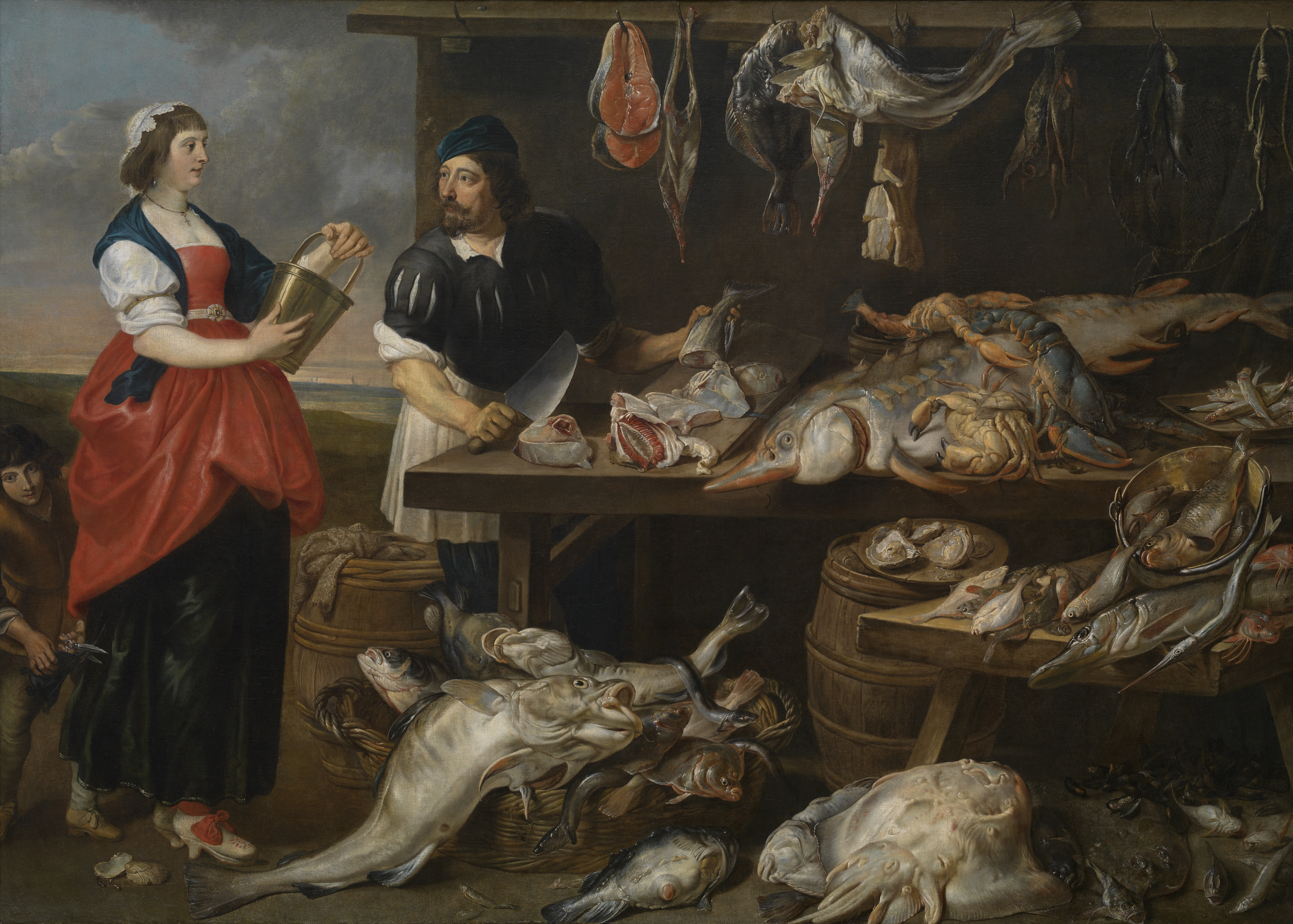
Fishmonger's Stall by Adriaen van Utrecht (1599–1652).

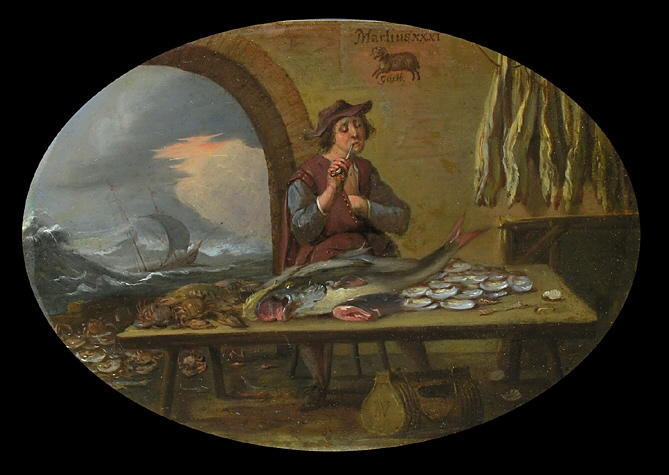
The fishmonger by Jan Ludewick Wouters (1599–1663).

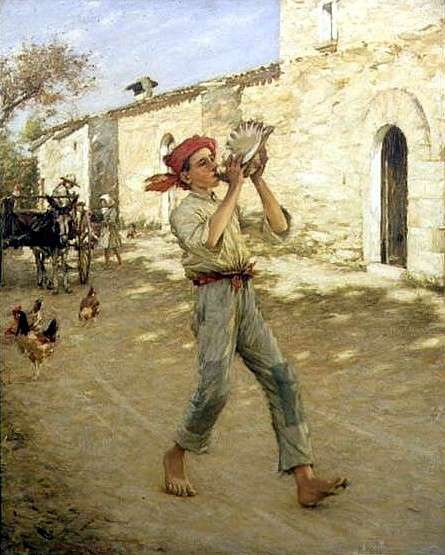
Crying fish in Spain by Henry Herbert La Thangue (1859–1929).

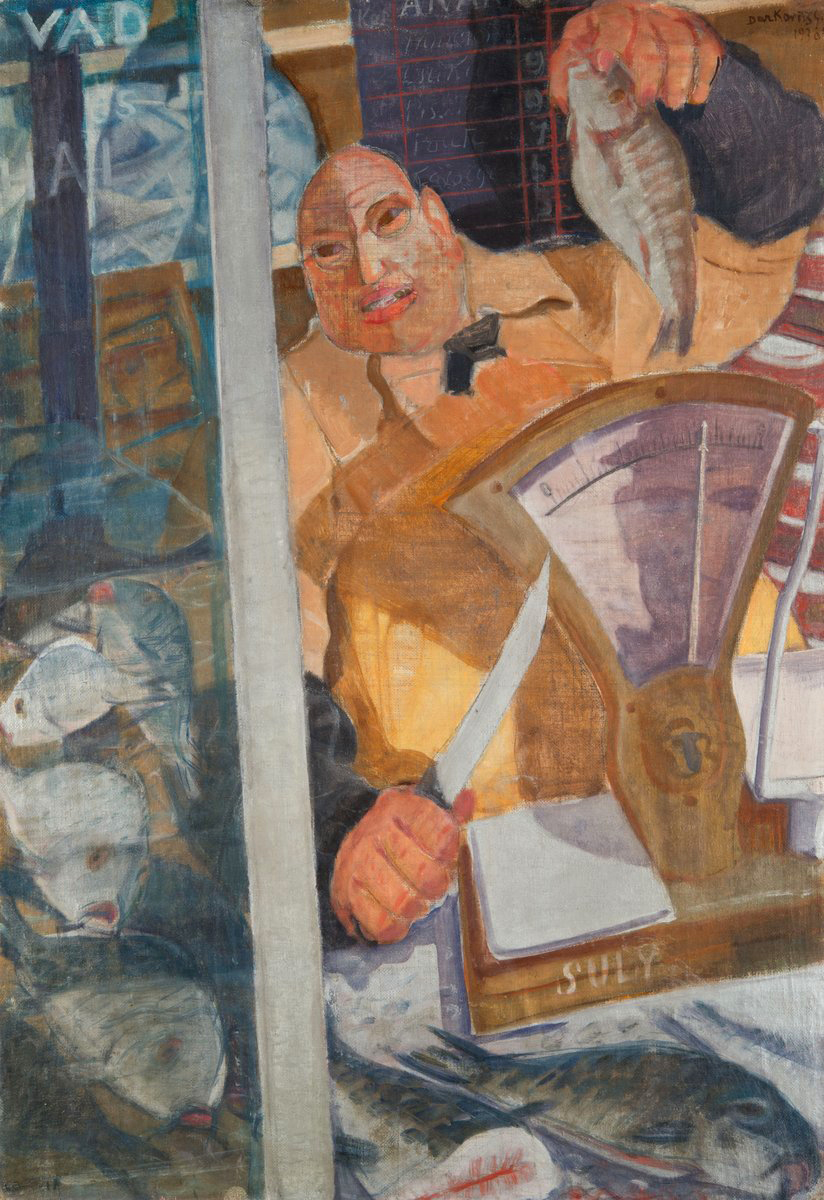
Fish seller, 1930. By Gyula Derkovits (1894–1934).
