= Fishwife =

Woman who sells fish, or is loud and foul-mouthed

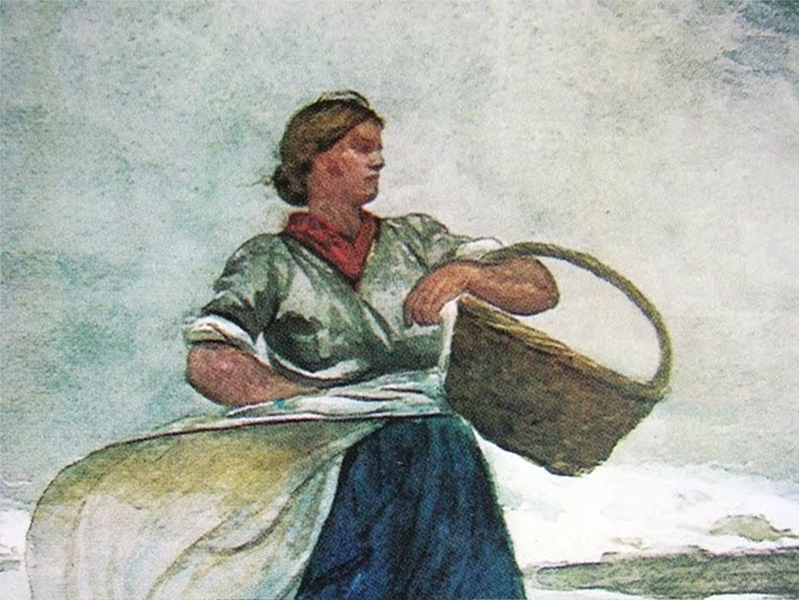
Detail of a Cullercoats fishlass, from Inside the Bar, by Winslow Homer 1883

A fishwife, fish-fag or fishlass is a woman who sells fish. She is typically the wife of a fisherman, selling her husband's catch, but other sources of fish have been used.

Some wives and daughters of fishermen were notoriously loud and foul-mouthed, as noted in the expression to swear like a fishwife, as they sold fish in the marketplace. Among the reasons for their outspokenness were that their wares were highly perishable and lost value if not sold quickly, and the similarity of their product to that of others selling the same thing, with volume of voice or colourful language drawing customer attention. Also, managing alone while their menfolk were away fishing for extended periods made them strong and self-sufficient.

In this context, the word wife means woman rather than married woman, from the Old English wif (woman).

== Billingsgate ==
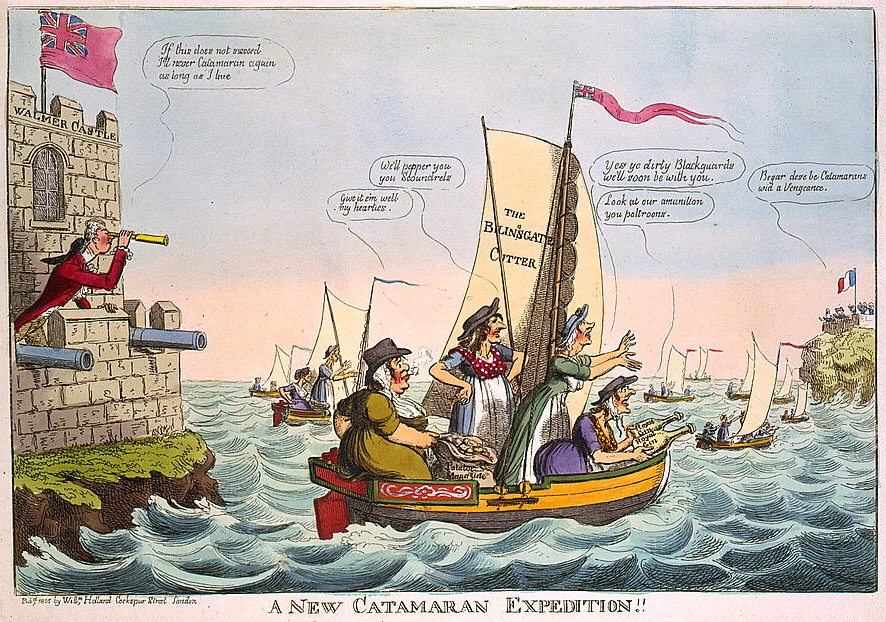
Isaac Cruikshank's 1805 political cartoon, A New Catamaran Expedition!!

London's traditional fish market was frequented by such types who were known as "the wives of Billingsgate". "They dressed in strong 'stuff' gowns and quilted petticoats; their hair, caps and bonnets were flattened into one indistinguishable mass upon their heads. ... They smoked small pipes of tobacco, took snuff, drank gin and were known for their colourful language."

In the 18th century, fishwives frequently appeared in satires as fearsome scourges of fops and foreigners. Their vigorous and decisive mien was contrasted with that of politicians who were, by contrast, portrayed as vacillating and weak. For example, in Isaac Cruikshank's A New Catamaran Expedition!!, a fleet of Billingsgate fishwives sails across the English Channel to terrorise the French and shame the British Prime Minister Pitt for his inaction.

== Cullercoats ==
The lore of the Cullercoats Fish Lass dates at least to the 19th century. William Finden noted, in 1842, that the wives and daughters of the Cullercoats fishermen searched for the bait, digging sand-worms, gathering mussels or seeking limpets and dog-crabs. They also assisted in baiting the hooks. Later, they'd carry the fish to market to sell them. "When fish are scarce, they not unfrequently carried a load on their shoulders, weighing between 3 or 4 stone (42 or 56 lb; 19 or 25 kg), to Newcastle, which is about ten miles distant from Cullercoats, in the hope of meeting with a better market."

Edward Corvan wrote and performed a popular music hall song, "The Cullercoats Fish Lass", in 1862:

Aw's a Cullercoats fish-lass, se cozy an' free
Browt up in a cottage close on by the sea;
An' aw sell fine fresh fish ti poor an' ti rich—
Will ye buy, will ye buy, will ye buy maw fresh fish?

The Cullercoats Fishlass became a popular subject of American artist, Winslow Homer, who resided in the picturesque fishing village, to paint, from the spring of 1881 to November 1882. Homer soon became sensitive to the strenuous and courageous lives of its inhabitants, particularly the women, whom he depicted hauling and cleaning fish, mending nets, and, most poignantly, standing at the water's edge, awaiting the return of their men.

Jean F. Terry wrote, in 1913, "The Cullercoats fishwife, with her cheerful weather-bronzed face, her short jacket and ample skirts of blue flannel, and her heavily laden "creel" of fish is not only appreciated by the brotherhood of brush and pencil, but is one of the notable sights of the district".

William S. Garson, in his 1935 book, The Romance of Old Tynemouth and Cullercoats, wrote: "The Cullercoats fishwife plays a man's part in helping to launch the lifeboat, frequently wading waist-high into furious and ice-cold waters, and she never hesitates to allow her man to take a place on the boat, though he may go to face death and disaster."

== Newhaven ==
The Scottish fishwives of Newhaven had a reputation among royalty. They were admired by Queen Victoria and considered to be supremely "handsome" by George IV. They were hard-bargainers though, and all the fishermen of the Firth of Forth brought their catches to Newhaven for the fishwives to sell in Edinburgh. The fishwives wore distinctive costumes of blue duffle coats covering layers of colourful striped petticoats with a muslin cap or other similar headdress. Their fish, such as haddock and herring, were carried on their backs in creels.

== Law ==
The case Bourhill v Young of 1942 concerned a pregnant Glasgow fishwife who had suffered psychiatric illness after witnessing a motorcycle accident. It went to the House of Lords, which held that a person of "customary phlegm" would not have been expected to suffer so.

== Gallery ==
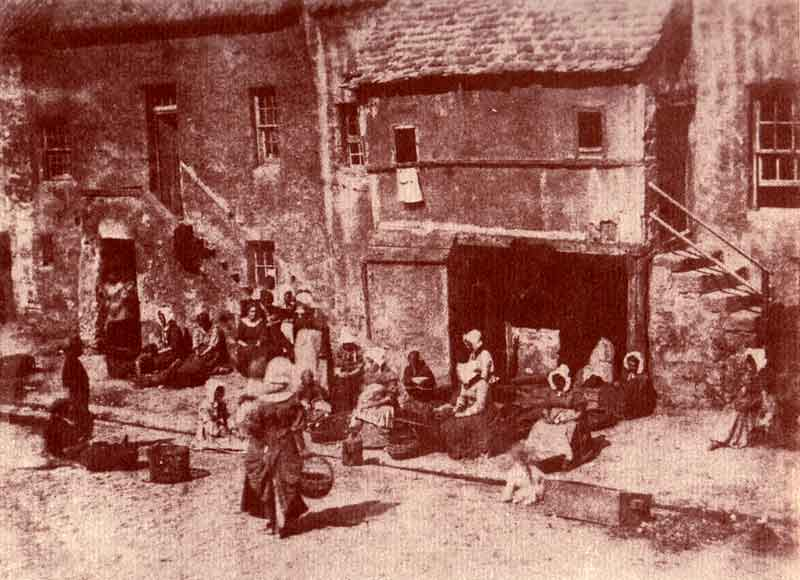
Fishwives in St Andrews, Scotland bait their lines

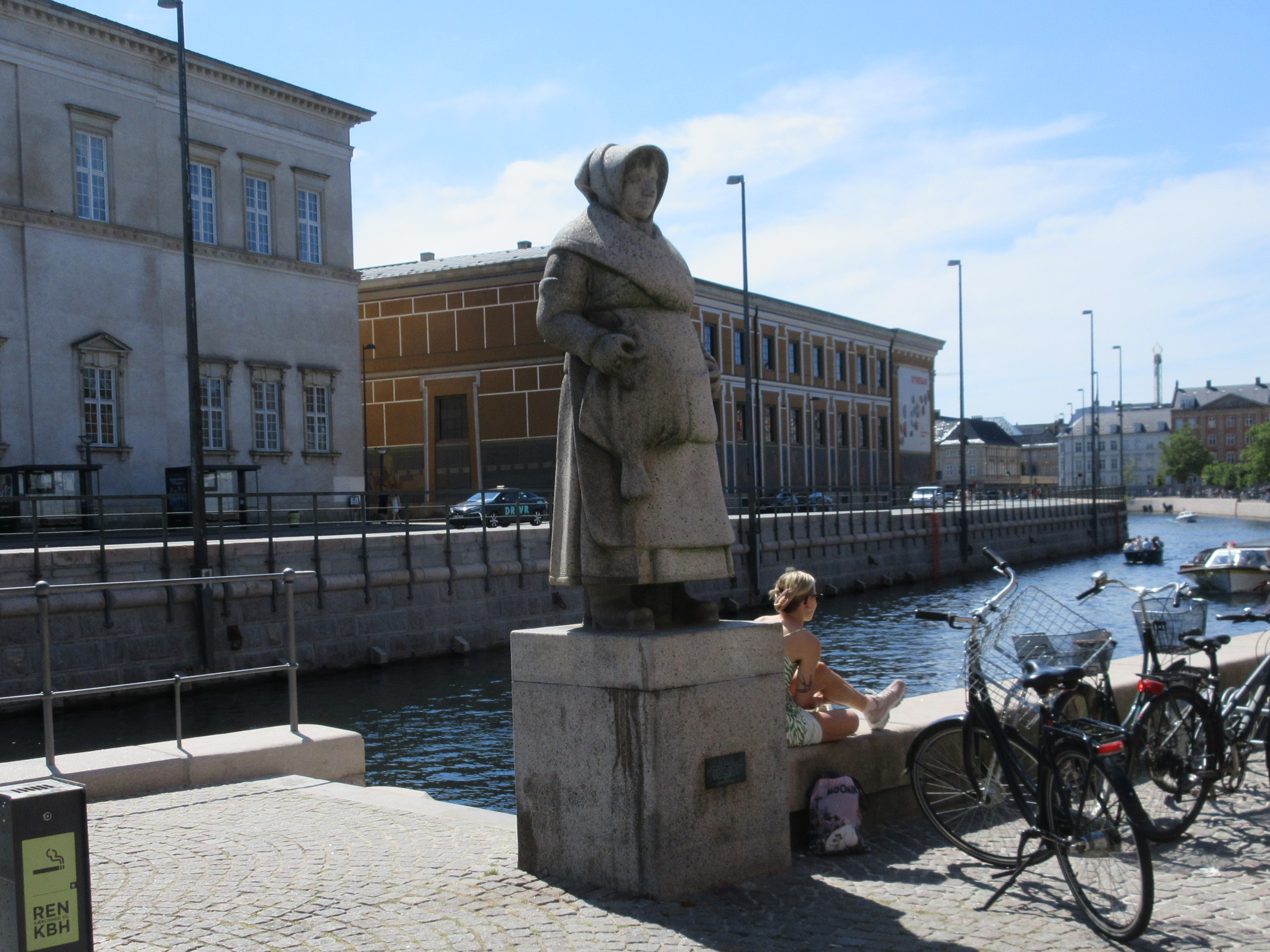
Fishwife (1940), Gammel Strand, Copenhagen

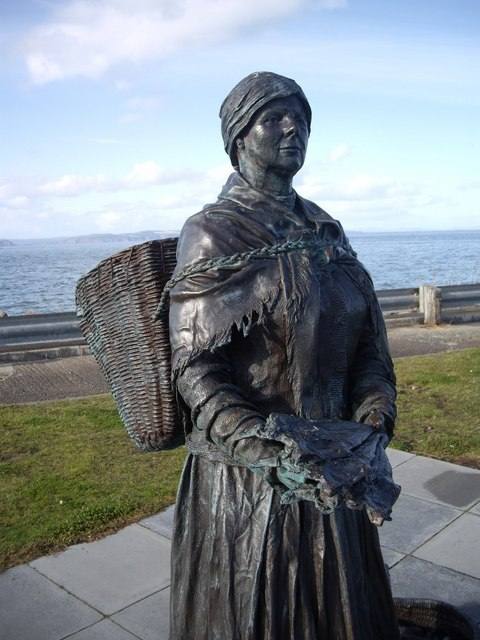
Statue of the Nairn Fishwife

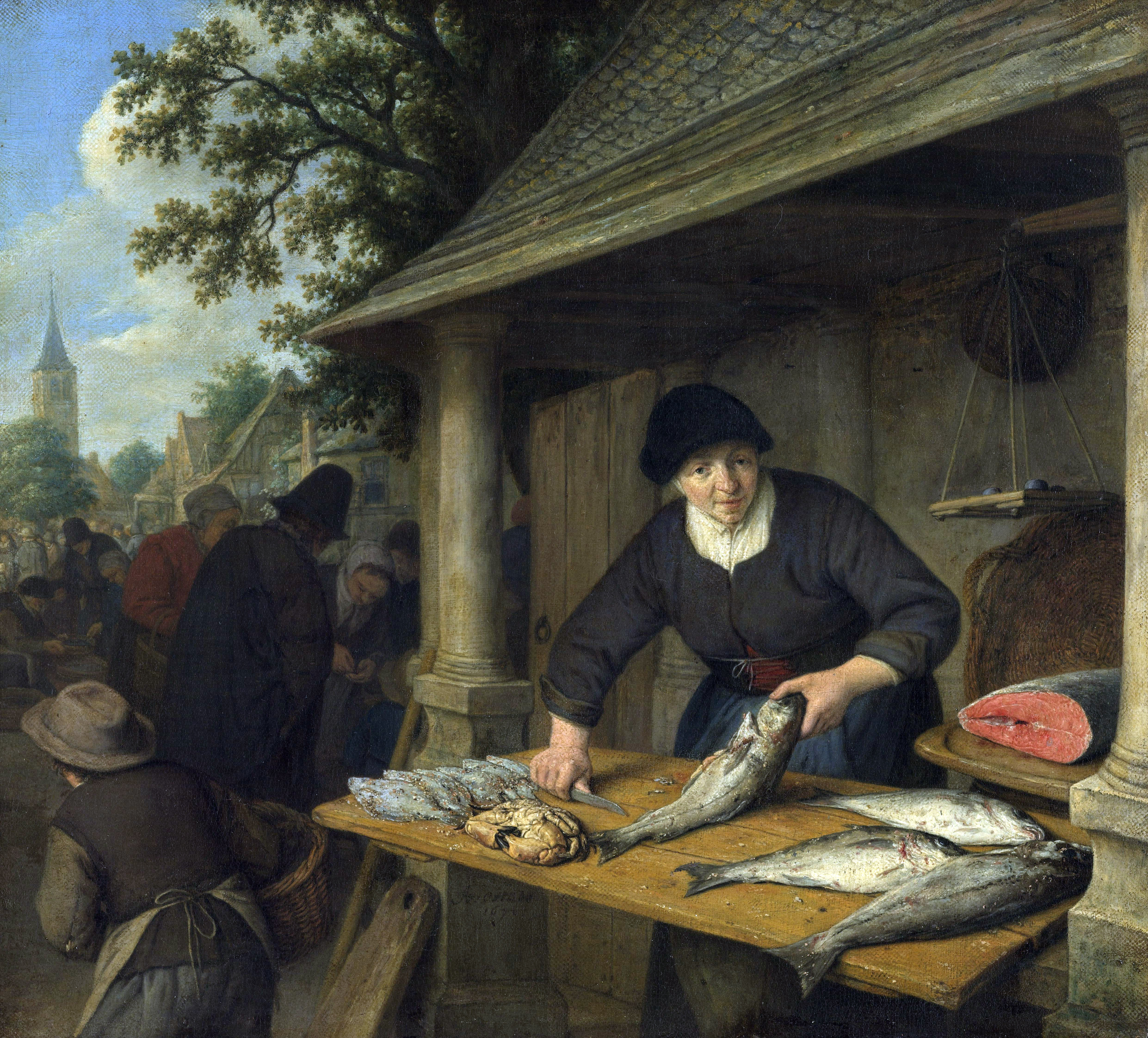
The fishwife, Holland 1672 by Adriaen van Ostade

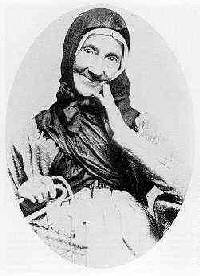
Legendary Victorian fishwife Dolly Peel, of South Shields

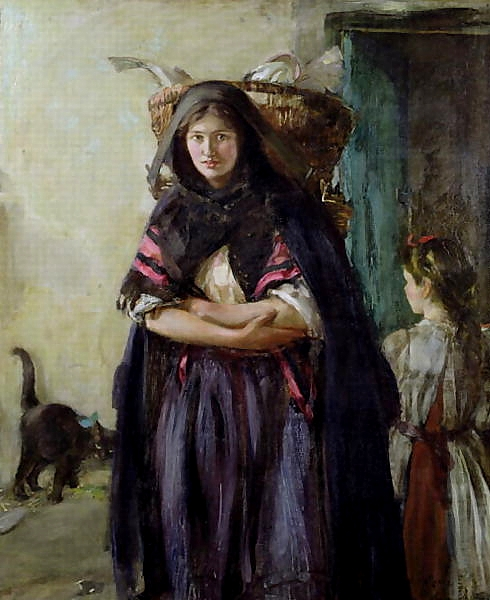
Newhaven fishwife with creel (by Alexander Ignatius Roche 1861–1921)

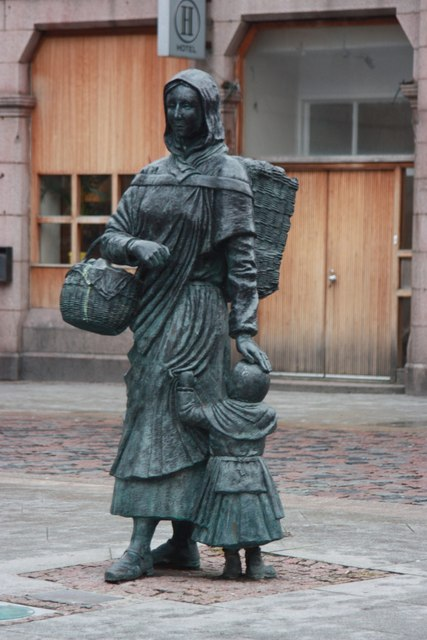
Bronze cast statue of a fishwife and little girl, Peterhead

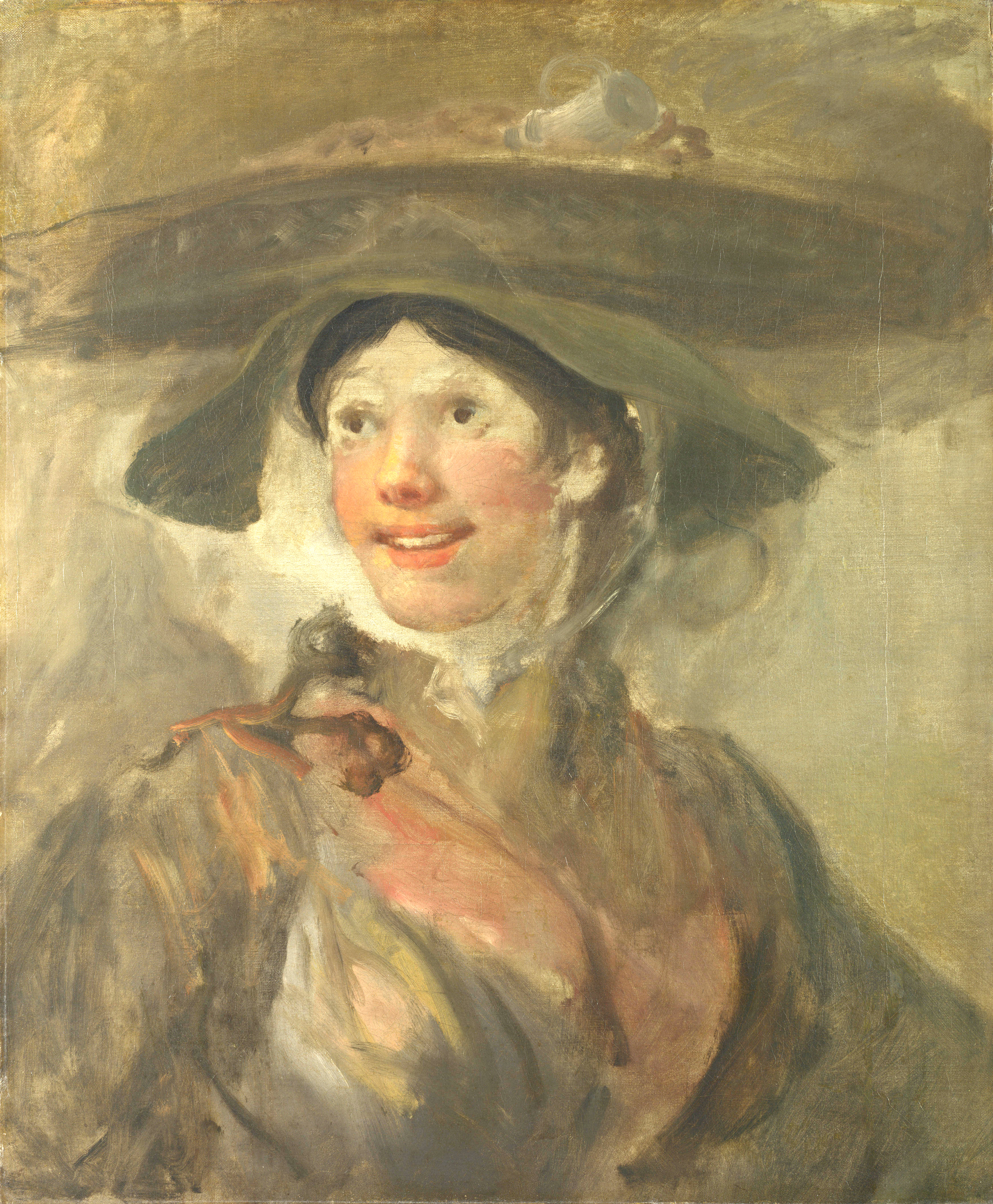
The Shrimp Girl by William Hogarth, c. 1740–1745

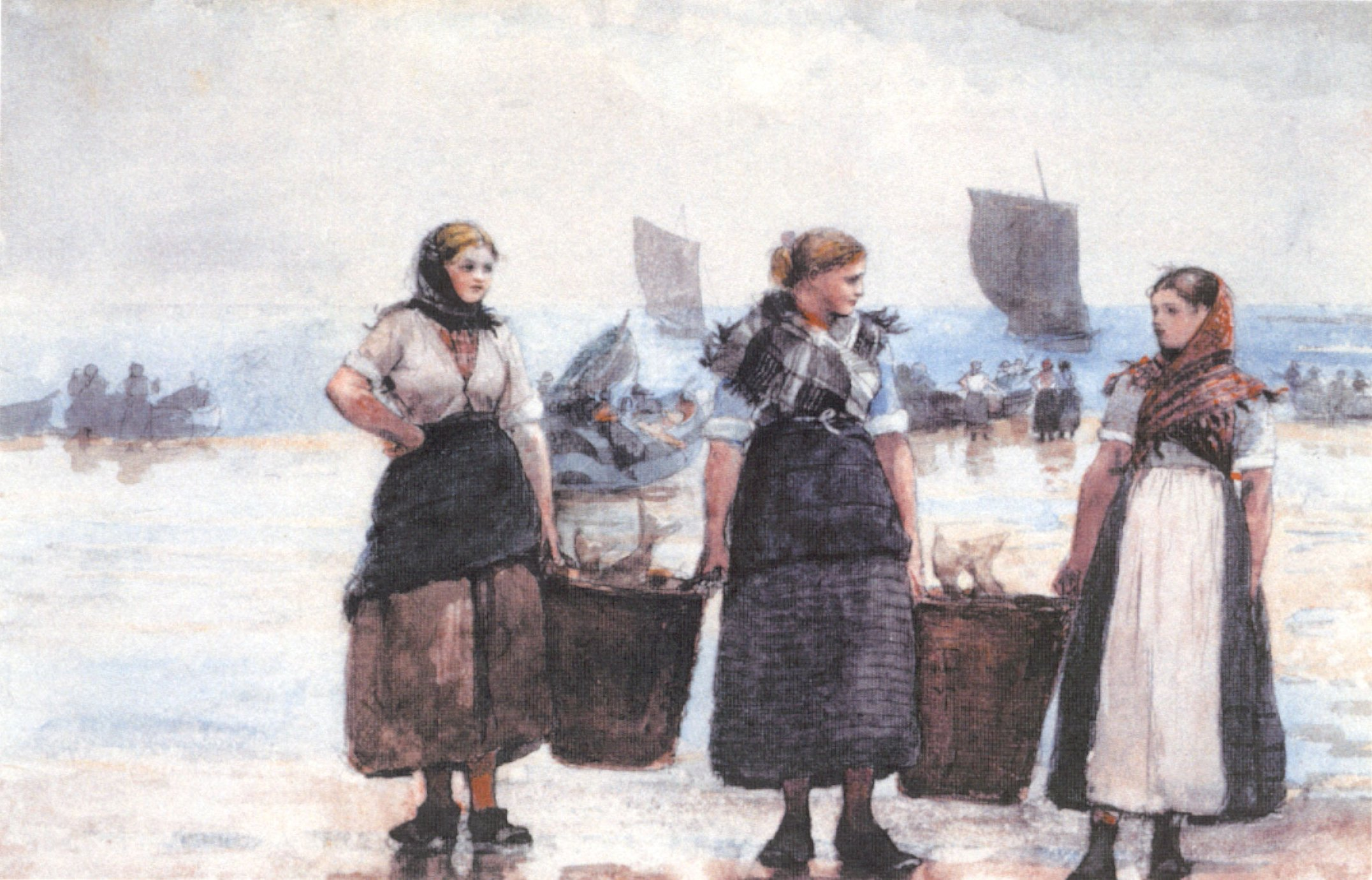
Fisherwomen, Cullercoats, Winslow Homer 1881

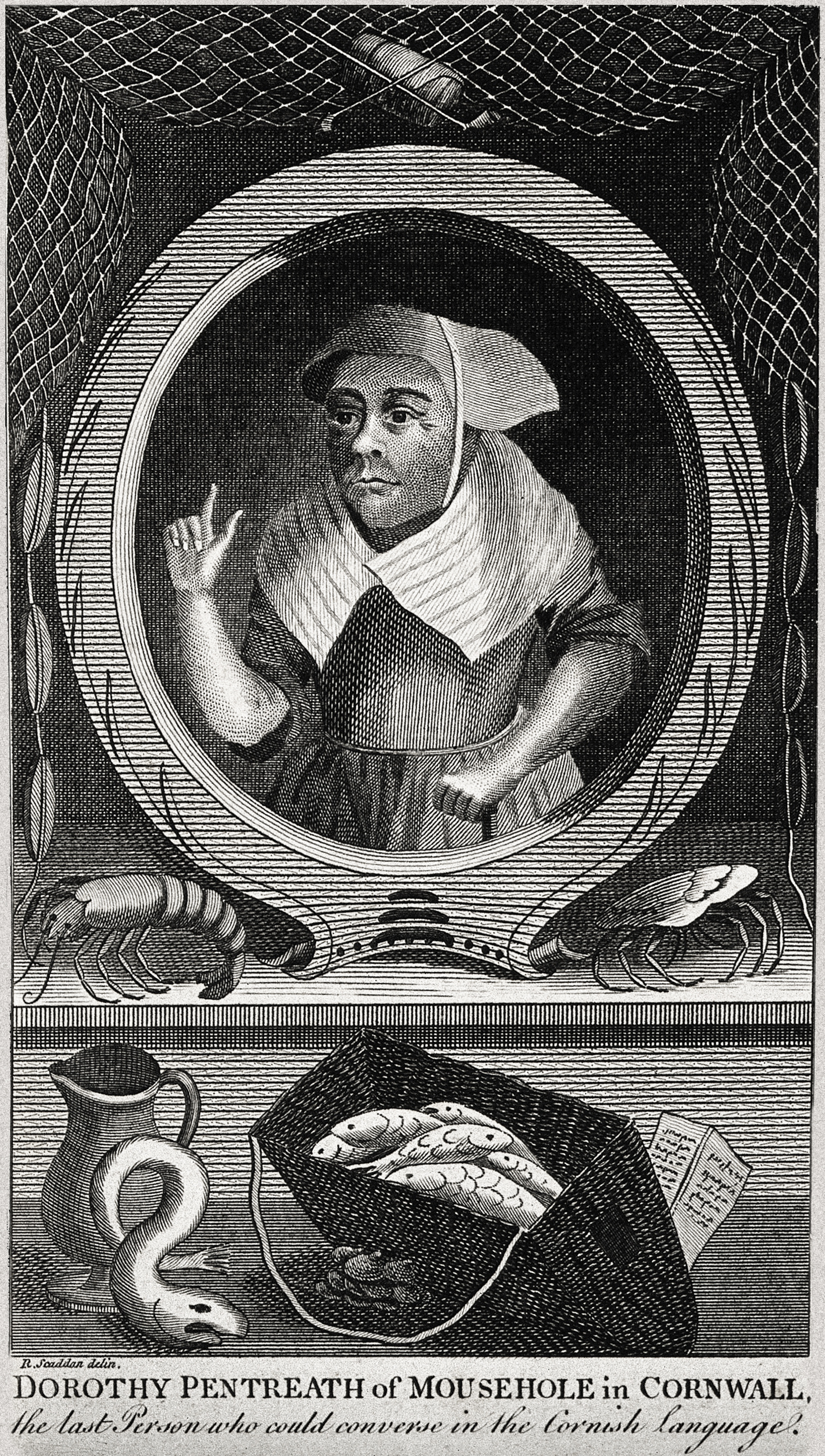
Dolly Pentreath (a Cornish fish jowster), in an engraved portrait published in 1781

== Famous fishwives ==
- Dolly Peel – a fishwife of South Shields
- Dolly Pentreath – the last native speaker of Cornish
- Marretje Arents – Dutch fishwife and rebel
- Molly Malone – the subject of an Irish song

== See also ==
- Fishmonger
- Haenyeo
