= Fishwife (statue) =

Coordinates: 55°40′39″N 12°34′46″E

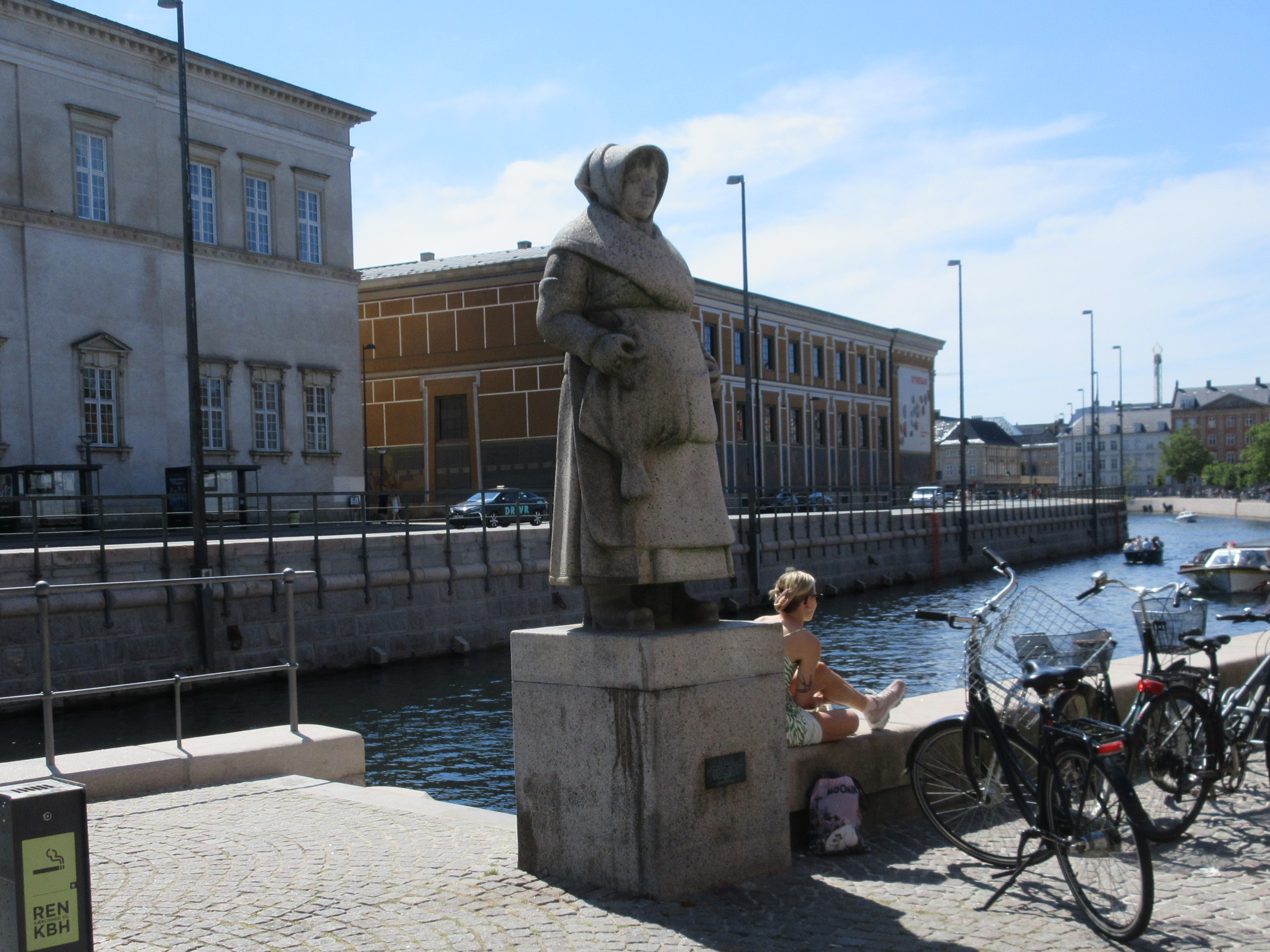
- The statue in 2022
- Artist: Charles Svejstrup-Madsen
- Year: 12 November 1939
- Medium: Granite
- Subject: Fishwife
- Dimensions: 187 cm × 80 cm (74 in × 31 in)
- Location: Copenhagen

Fishwife (Danish: Fiskerkone) is a 1940 granite statue of a fishwife situated at Gammel Strand in Copenhagen, Denmark, commemorating the fact that the city's principal fish market was then located at the site. It represents one of the so-called Skovser Women who, wearing their traditional garments, used to dominate the market trade. The fish market closed in 1958.

== Description ==
The granite statue measures 187 cm × 80 cm × 80 cm (6.14 ft × 2.62 ft × 2.62 ft). The fishwife is depicted wearing an apron, shawl and scarf. She holds a plaice in her right hand.

== History ==
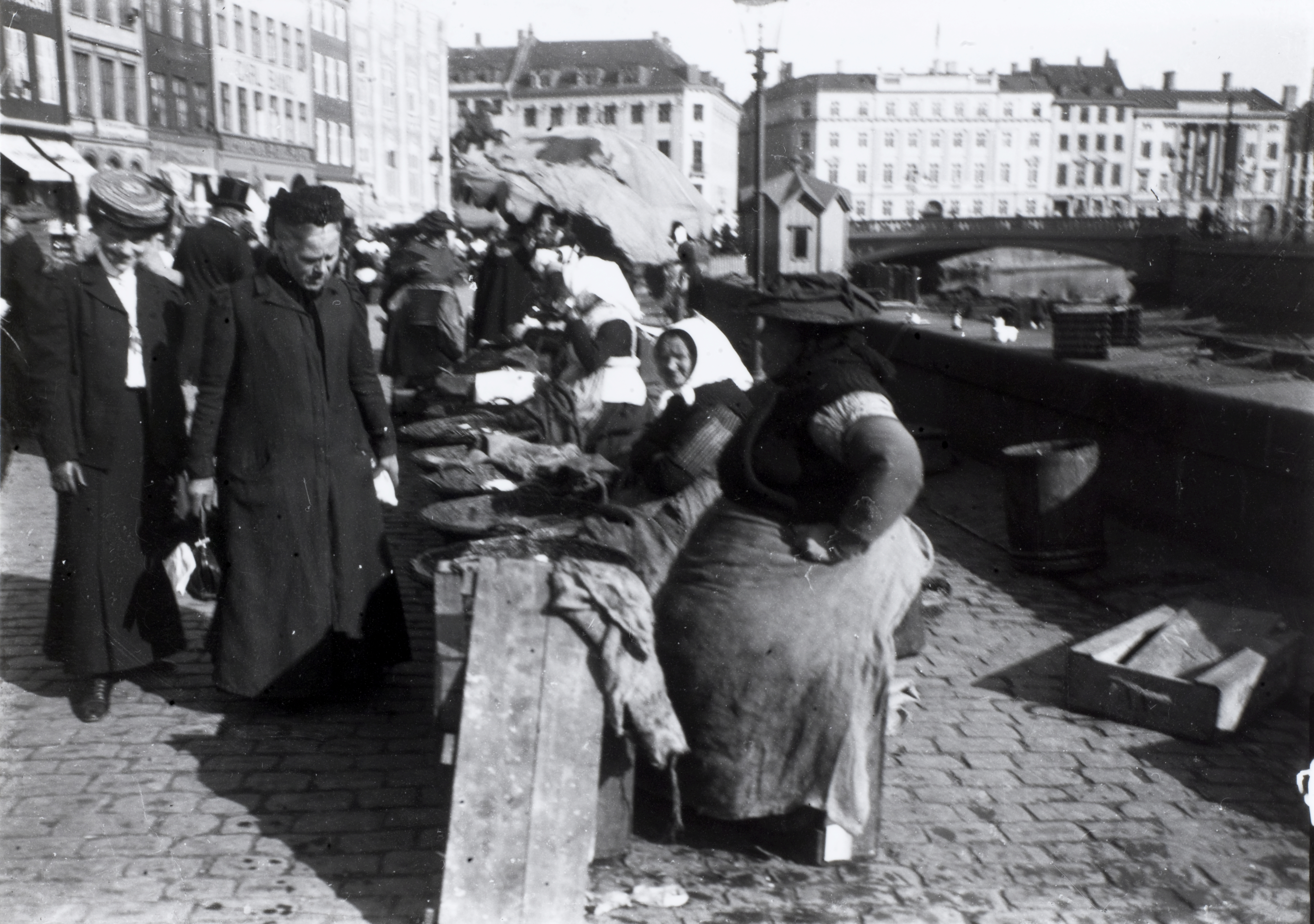
Fishwives at Gammel Strand photographed by Paul Gustav Fischer.

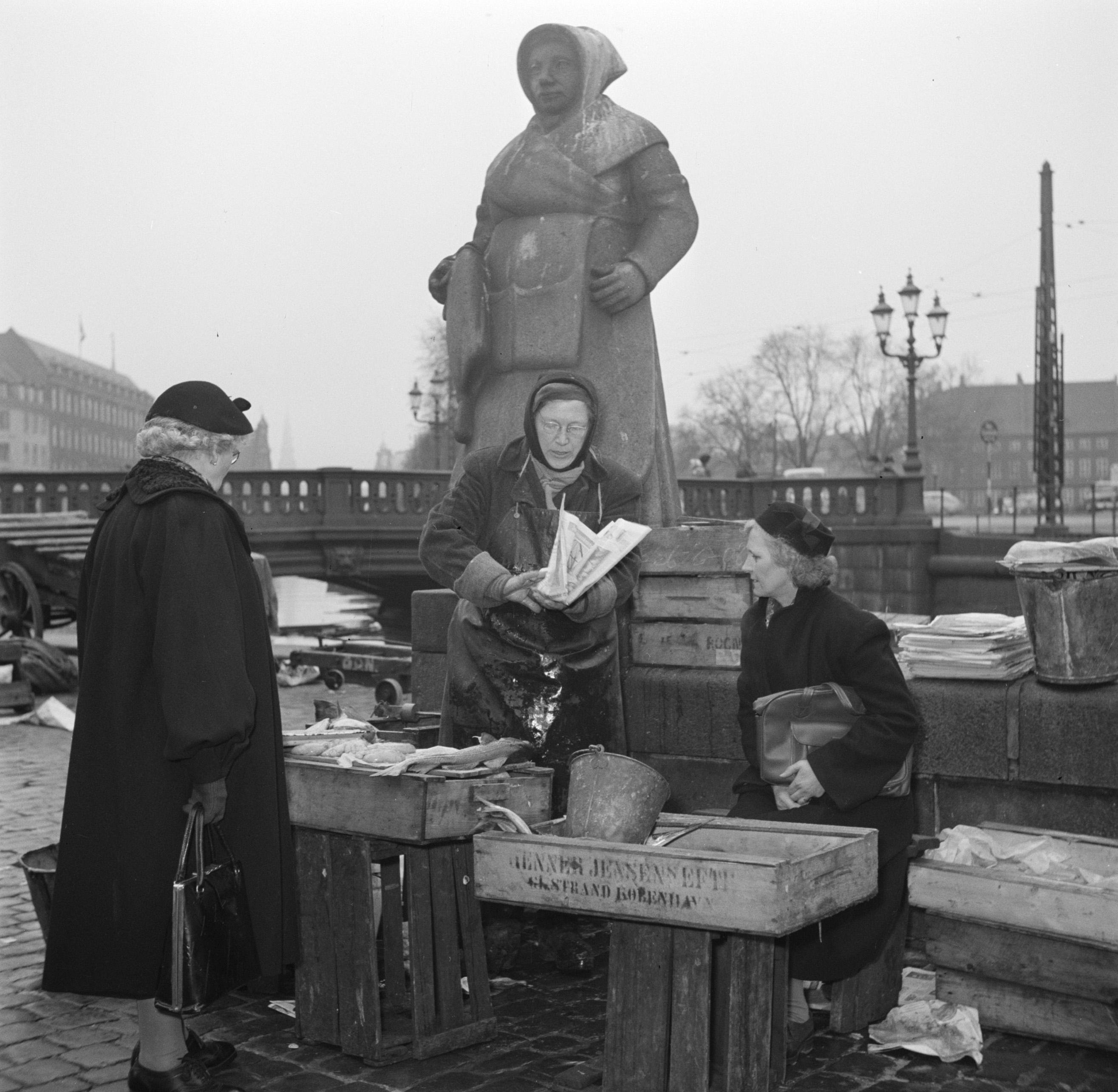
Fishwives selling fish by the foot of the statue in 1954.

Copenhagen's principal fish market was for centuries situated at Gammel Strand. The statue was donated to the city by the Foundation for the Promotion of Art in the City (Fonden for kunstneriske Formåls Fremme). It was created by Charles Svejstrup Madsen; (1883-1946). The statue was unveiled on 12 November 1940. The newspaper Berlingske Tidende brought an incidental poem by Viggo Barfoed), published under his pseudonym Ærbødigst (lit. "Yours sincerely"), entitled “There’s Nothing Like Change”:

Art must be brought/ to the people./ This is a programme/ that is interpreted so/ that lots of /statues are raised/ on all greenswards /and open spaces./ A fishwife/ of six thousand kilos,/ that’s to say no real/ Venus de Milo/ can be admired/by later generations/ on the Fish Market/ at Gammel Strand./ She has cost a great deal/ in purely monetary terms/ but on the other hand women are/immortal. People die, fish die,/ but the fishwife lives,/ she can easily last/ a hundred years./ And although she’s really/ not bad/ the sight of her/ makes one think:/ One could avoid/ paying for the very costly/material,/ and it would perhaps/ please many/ if statues/ were made of snow./The city would lose nothing./ A little variety/ would be created,/ and the artists/ would have more to do, which of course/ can also be important./In winter,/ when all nature sleeps,/ we would have art/ to delight in./ In summer we have/ the green trees/ and then we have no need/ of works of art here.

The statue was removed in 2011 in conjunction with the construction of the Gammel Strand metro station. It was later temporarily installed at Sydhavn station. In September 2018, it returned to Gammel Strand.
