= Eva Elwes =

Eva Elwes (born Gertrude Emma Cannon; 1876–1950) was an English actress and playwright who wrote over 50 plays between 1907 and 1938.

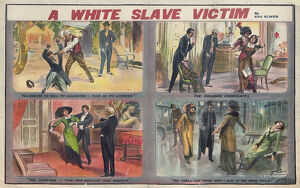
"White Slave Victim" by Eva Elwes

== Acting career ==
Between 1896 and the late 1920s Elwes performed in a variety of plays and variety shows. She regularly performed in her own plays which were often staged by Will H. Glaze’s touring theatre company. She also acted in other touring companies playing mostly in the north of England.

In 1922 Will Glaze set up the Alexandra Players at the Alexandra Theatre, South Shields. Elwes's second husband, Ernest Eykyn, became the theatre’s stage manager and artist, and she performed in the Alexandra Players. Elwes became the co-lessee of the theatre with Ethel Hird from 1930–1940. When the theatre closed in 1940, due to the World War II blackout, a newspaper article recalled "some particularly fine performances by that grand dowager of drama Eva Elwes".

Elwes and Eykyn both contributed to the Actors’ Benevolent Fund from the production of one her plays The Cottage Girl.

== Playwright ==
Elwes was one of several female writers of melodramas in the early 20th century. She wrote over 50 plays, mostly melodramas but also pantomimes, in the thirty-year period 1907–1938. Forty six plays were submitted to the Lord Chamberlain (the official censor) for licensing, and the scripts and Readers’ Reports are held in the British Library Lord Chamberlain Plays Collection. References to other plays, not submitted for licence, can be found in newspapers of the time.

Her first play was a musical drama His Sister’s Honour which was staged in Fleetwood in January 1907.

=== World War I themes ===
Several plays had wartime themes and settings, such as Joy, Sister of Mercy, John Raymond's Daughter and Billy's Mother. German spies and the sinking of a U-boat feature in Heaven at the Helm.

==== The Price She Paid ====
The Price She Paid dramatised the story of Edith Cavell the British nurse who was shot by the Germans in 1915 after being suspected of spying.

In 1925 the Alexandra Theatre in South Shields submitted an application to the Lord Chamberlain for a licence for Elwes's play entitled Edith Cavell, Nurse and Martyr. The Lord Chamberlain would not grant a licence after consultation with Cavell's sisters who did not feel the play was accurate. In 1927 the Alexandra Theatre resubmitted its application. It was initially refused again but when Elwes changed the title to The Price She Paid and changed the names of the characters of Cavell and her mother a licence was granted. The Price She Paid was performed at the Alexandra Theatre in 1927.

=== Tyneside themes ===
Elwes wrote two plays on local Tyneside identities (Dolly Peel and Fifty Fafty).

==== Dolly Peel ====
Elwes's play told the story of Dolly Peel, a South Shields fishwife and smuggler, who lived 1782 to 1857. The play was first performed in August 1923 at the Alexandra Theatre with Will Glaze and Elwes in the cast; the scenery was designed and painted by Ernest Eykyn.

A handwritten script of Dolly Peel was discovered during renovations of a building in South Shields in 2004. The play was revived and performed at the Customs House in 2005 to mark the theatre's 10th anniversary.

==== Fifty Fafty ====
Fifty Fafty is about an old sailor of North Shields. It was performed by the Alexandra Players on their first anniversary in February 1923.

== Licensed plays ==
- His Sister's Honour (1907)
- The Royal Mail (1908)
- Salome (1910)
- For her Son (1912)
- Anybody's Wife (1912) (co-authored with Kennedy Allen)
- Love and What Then (1913)
- A White Slave of the Streets (1913) (changed to A White Slave Victim)
- Mary Latimer – Nun (1913)
- Mother Mine (1914)
- Joy, Sister of Mercy (1914)
- His Mother's Rosary (1915)
- The Woman Pays – Back (1915)
- John Raymond's Daughter (1915)
- Pals (1915)
- Should a Woman Forgive? (1916)
- The Sunshine of Paradise Alley (1916)
- Heaven at the Helm (1916)
- The Fishermaid of Old St Malo (1916)
- A Mother's Prayer (1916)
- The Cottage Girl (1916)
- Honour the Man you Wed (1917)
- The Girl Mother (1917)
- His Wife's Good Name (1917)
- Love's Young Dream (1918)
- Billy's Mother (1918)
- Kitty of Kensington (1920)
- The Child who Stood Between (1920)
- The Scandalmongers (1920)
- Not Fit to Marry (1922)
- Fifty Fafty (1923)
- Dolly Peel (1923)
- St Joan of Arc (1924)
- Under Red Rule (1925)
- Uncle Tom's Cabin (1925)
- The Ten Commandments (1926)
- The Price She Paid (1927)
- The Roll of the Drum (1928)
- Charity Children (1931)
- The Bonny Fishwife (1932)
- Jessica's First Prayer (1932)
- The Poor Little Rich Girl (1935)
- Smilin Thru (1937)
- Min and Bill (1937)
- The Silence of Dean Maitland (1937)
- Rudge, Martin and Baker (1938)

== Personal life ==
Elwes was cast together with her first husband Henry Charles Gilpin in several productions between 1896 and 1899.

Between 1900 and 1918 Elwes and her second husband Ernest Eykyn appeared together in a number of productions. Elwes lived in Walsall from about 1911 to 1921 and then in South Shields. Elwes died on 16 June 1950 in Cleckheaton, Yorkshire.
