= Dolly Peel =

British poet and hawker (1782–1857)

Dorothy Peel
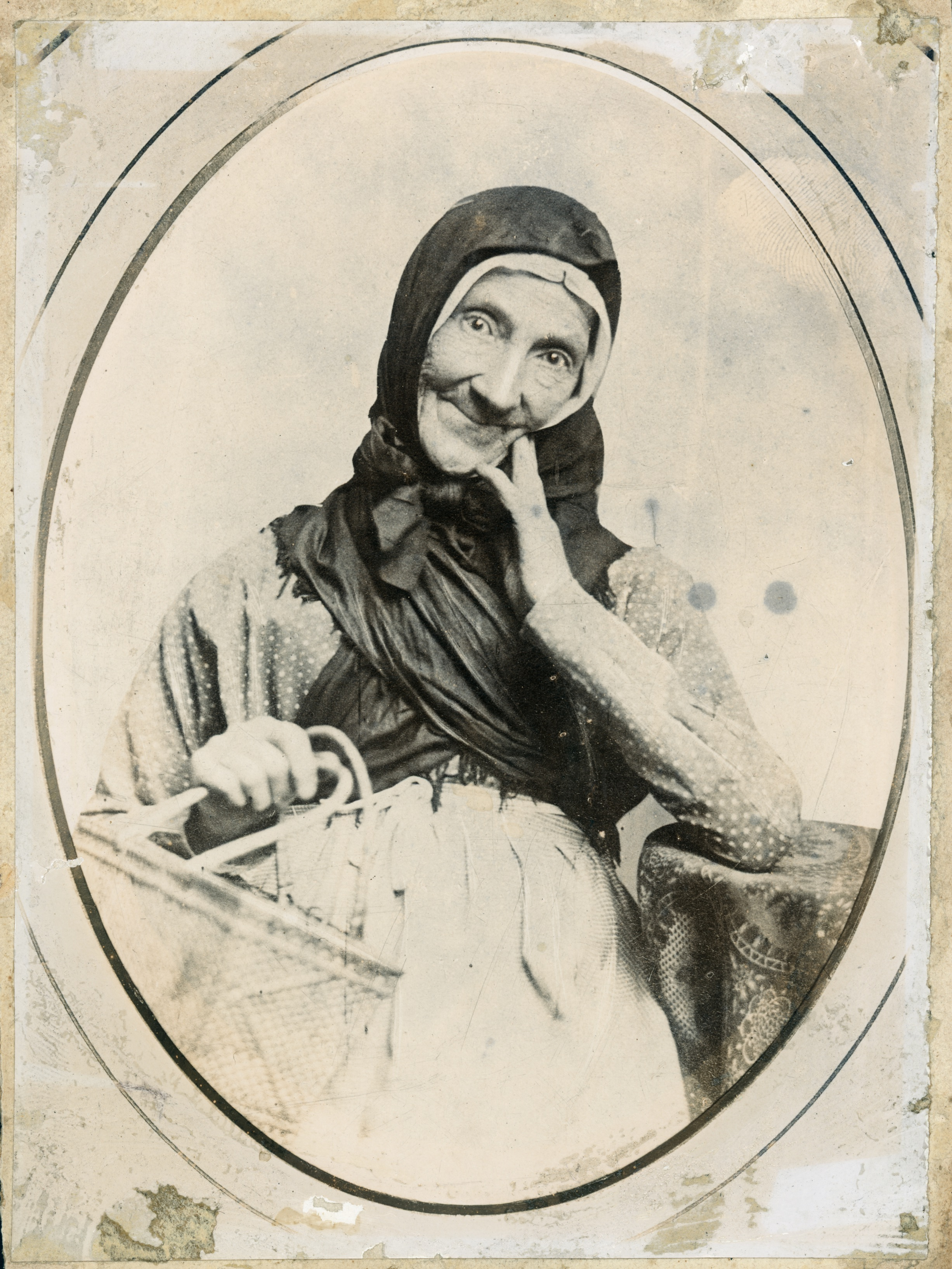
- Born: 1782
- Died: 14 October 1857 (aged 76)

Dorothy Peel (1782–1857), better known as Dolly Peel, was a person in South Shields, England, who acquired local legendary status. She is commemorated by a statue in the centre of the town.

== Life ==
Peel was a fishwife, but was also known as a smuggler and as a protector of local sailors from the press gang. During the Napoleonic Wars, when her husband Cuthbert Peel and son were press-ganged to serve in the Royal Navy, Dolly sneaked on board the ship and hid. After being discovered, she was given work as a nurse to sick and wounded sailors. Her work and dedication was respected, and she was allowed to stay on board with her family. She was rewarded by a pardon for her initial attempts to interfere with naval practice. Her husband and son were released from the navy and were exempted from future press-ganging. The incident made her into a local heroine.

Back in South Shields, she worked as a hawker of allegedly contraband goods and became well known for her wit and colourful stories. She also published poetry, most notably verses praising the local liberal MP Robert Ingham, of whom she was a strong supporter, during the 1841 general election.

According to census date, in 1841 Dorothy Peel (Dolly) was living at Ropery Stairs near Shadwell Street. By 1851 she had relocated to Lookham Stairs, near Shadwell Street with her husband Cuthbert Peel.

On Wednesday 14 October 1857 Dolly died aged 76.

== Commemorations ==
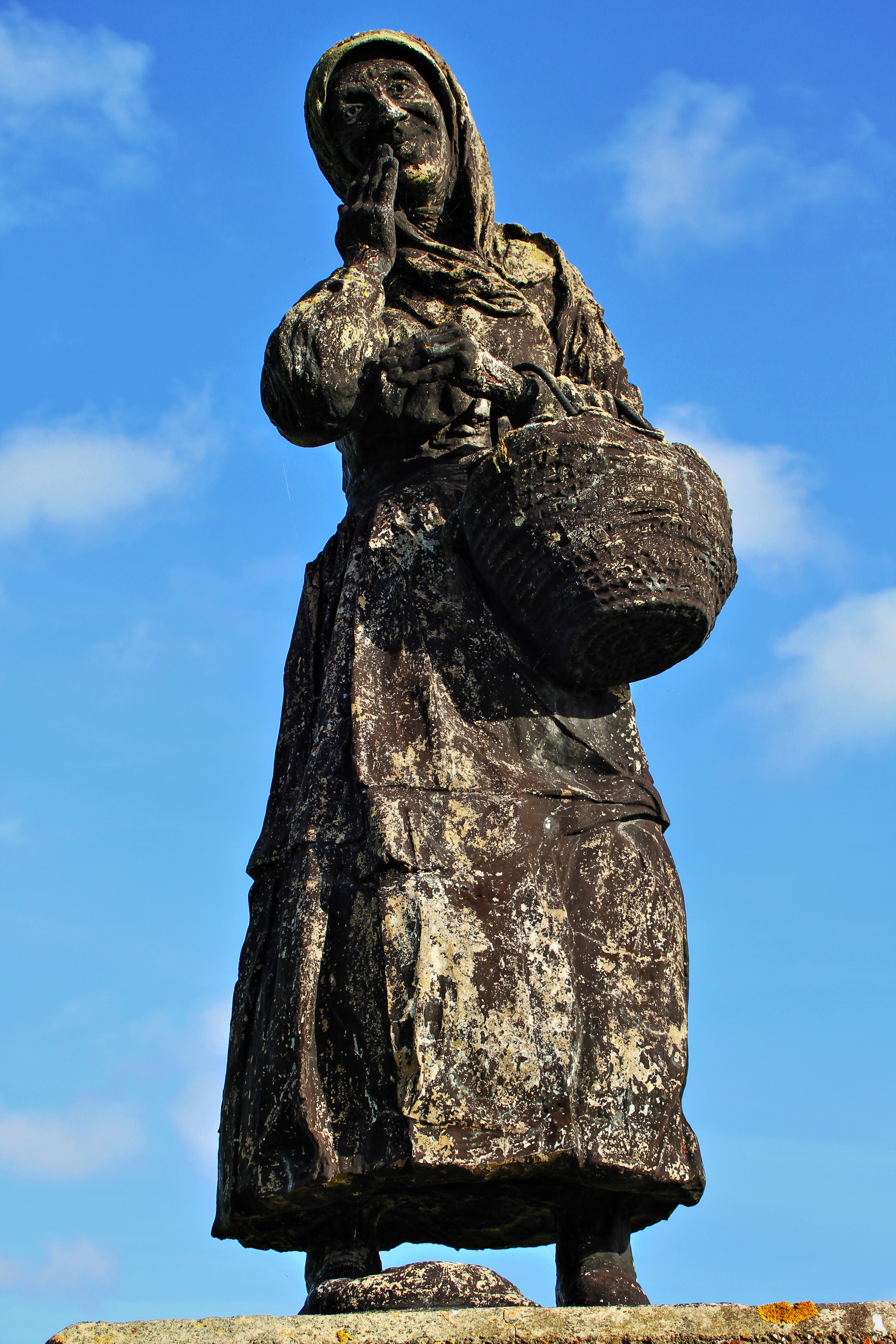
Dolly Peel statue in South Shields, facing the River Tyne

In 1923 South Shields playwright Eva Elwes wrote Dolly Peel, a play based on her life. It was revived by the Customs House theatre in 2005.

In the 1980s a statue was commissioned by Reg Peel of South Tyneside Metropolitan Borough Council, who is her great-great-great grandson. It was intended as a tribute to the strength of local working women. It was based on a surviving photograph of Dolly and was designed by Billy Gofton. It was unveiled in 1987. The statue is located on River Drive, near the junction with Palatine Street. She is depicted looking out over the River Tyne.

A public house in Commercial Road, South Shields, is named "Dolly Peel" after the legendary character and contains various tributes to her amongst its furnishings and wall decorations.
