= Gammel Strand =

Square in Copenhagen

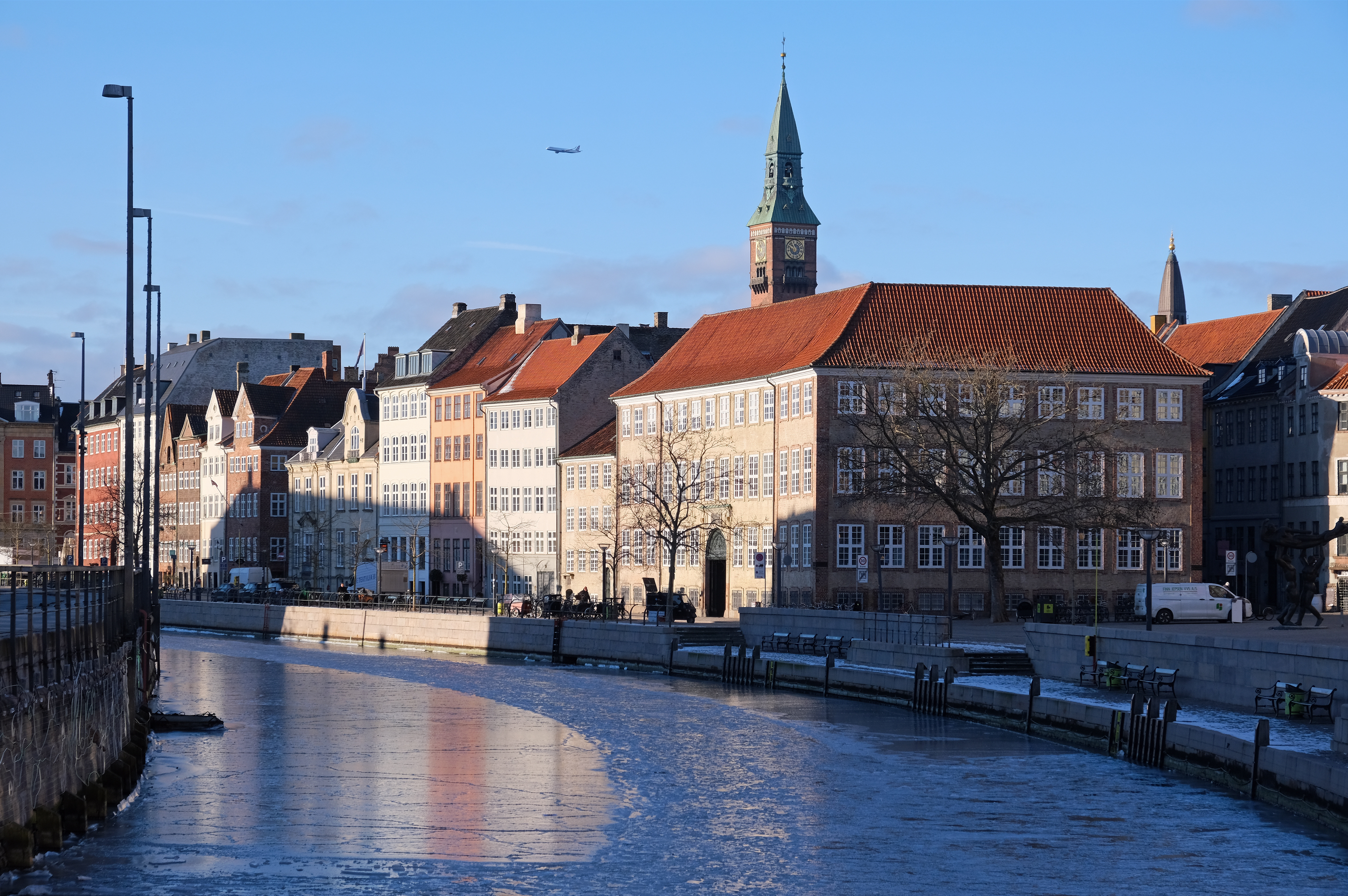
- Interactive map of Gammel Strand
- Length: 164 m (538 ft)
- Location: Indre By, Copenhagen, Denmark
- Postal code: 1200
- Nearest metro station: Gammel Strand
- Coordinates: 55°40′39″N 12°34′41.16″E

Gammel Strand (modern Danish for "old beach"; originally meant "the old shoreline", i.e. prior to land reclamations) is a street and public square in central Copenhagen, Denmark. On the south side it borders on the narrow Slotsholmens Canal while the north side is lined by a row of brightly coloured houses from the 18th and 19th century. Across the canal, Thorvaldsens Museum and Christiansborg Palace are seen on the island Slotsholmen.

The art gallery Kunstforeningen and the Ministry of Culture are the most notable institutions facing the street.

== History ==
=== Copenhagen's cradle ===
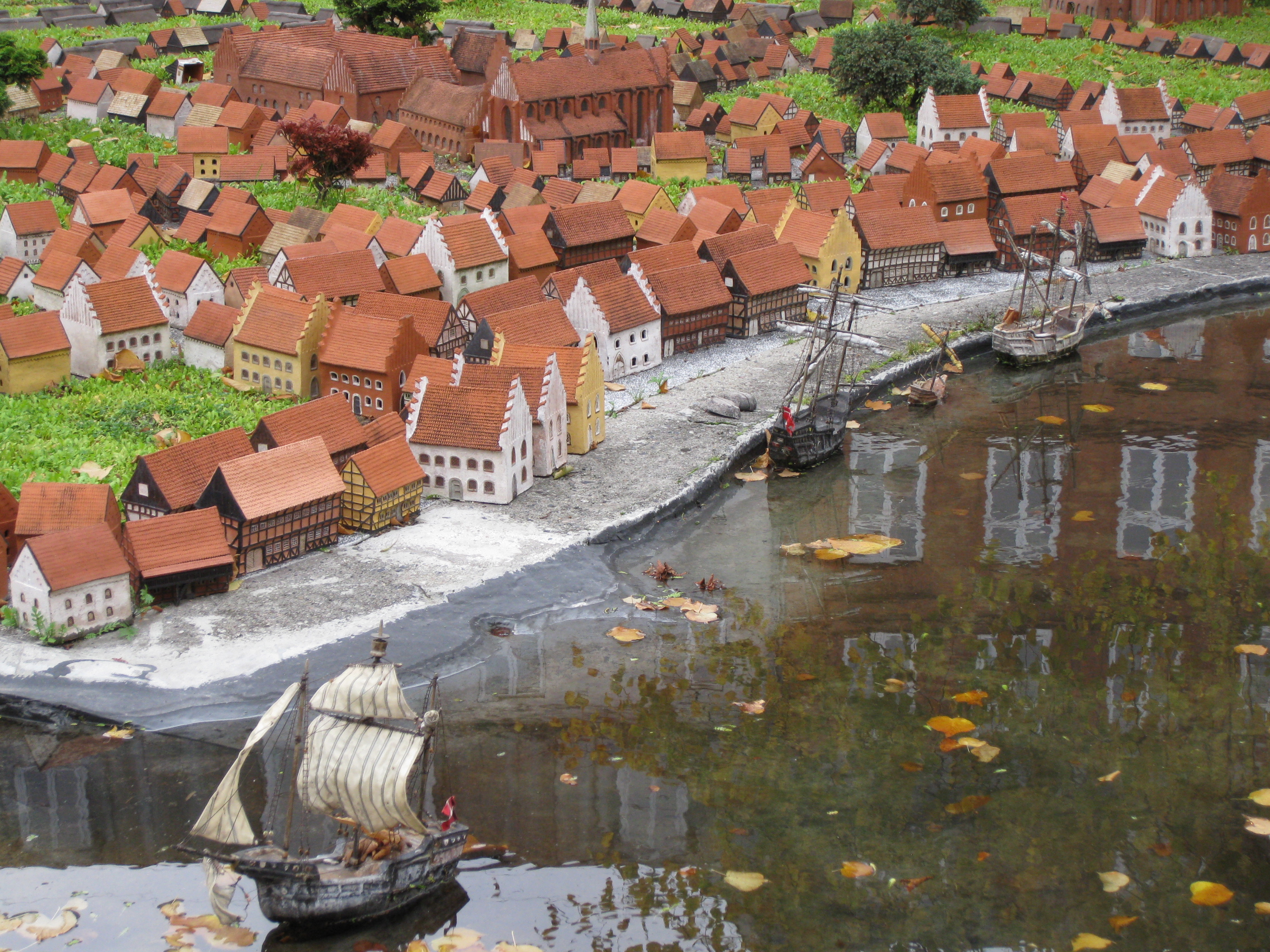
The 16th century shoreline at Gammel Strand as reconstructed in the miniature town of Museum of Copenhagen.

Gammel Strand used to be the site of a natural harbour, sheltered by a few small islets later to develop into Slotsholmen. It was around this harbour that Copenhagen was founded as a small fishing and trading settlement in the 11th century. However, archeological finds of ship parts and railings under several of the buildings at Gammel Strand indicate that the coast line at that time was located considerably further inland than the present canal. The area was marshy and boats were initially merely pulled up on the beach. Recent archaeological discoveries during work on the Copenhagen Metro have revealed traces of jetties at Gammel Strand, which date back to around the year 700. Later land reclamations moved the coastline forward and a proper harbour developed.

=== The fish market ===
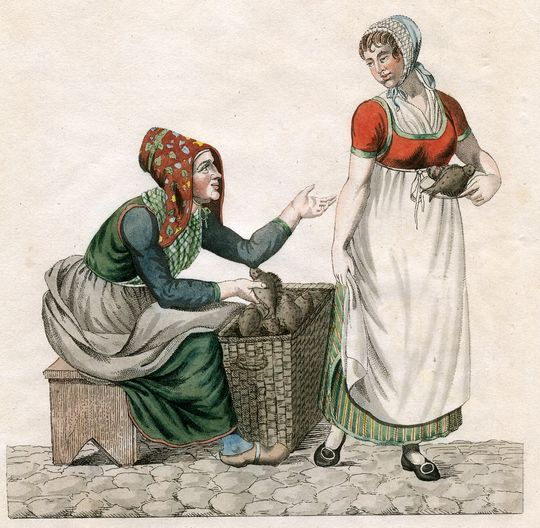
Skovser women, c. 1800

Later Gammel Strand became the site of a fish market, known for the women who would sit in the square at all seasons to sell their fish. It was also known as Skovserkoner (English: Skovser women) because they would buy their fish in the small fishing village Skovshoved north of Copenhagen and walk the long way to Gammel Strand to sell them in the market. They were recognized by their characteristic white scarves.

=== Destroyed by fire ===
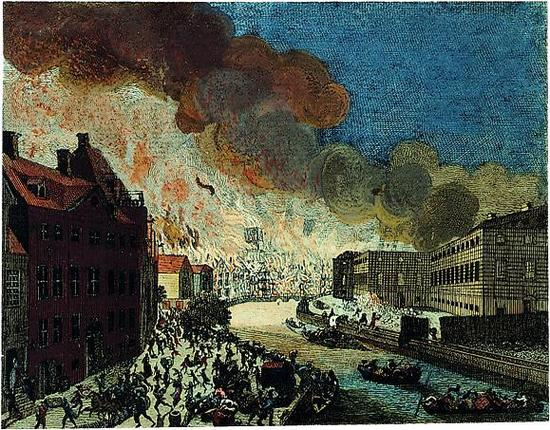
Gammel Strand on fire

Most of the buildings along Gammel Strand were completedly destroyed in the Copenhagen Fire of 1795. It began in a coal and timber storage at Gammelholm, and spread to the area around St. Nicolas' Church before moving along Gammel Strand to the area around Gammeltorv and Nytorv. In the following years the houses were rebuilt.

=== Later developments ===
In the post-war years space for the market became too scarce, and in 1958 a new fish market opened in the South Harbour. In 1991, the parking lots which took up the square were abandoned and the square was paved with granite stones. It has since been home to several small flea markets.

== Buildings ==
Most of the houses have been rebuilt and extended with an extra story over the years and exhibit a multitude of different styles. In spite of this the overall impression is very harmonic, and Gammel Strand is now considered one of the most iconic urban spaces in Copenhagen.

The oldest house in the street is No. 48. Built in 1750 to the design of Philip de Lange, it survived the fire of 1795 without severe damage. In 1796 it was extended with an extra story. Today it houses the Kunstforeningen art gallery.

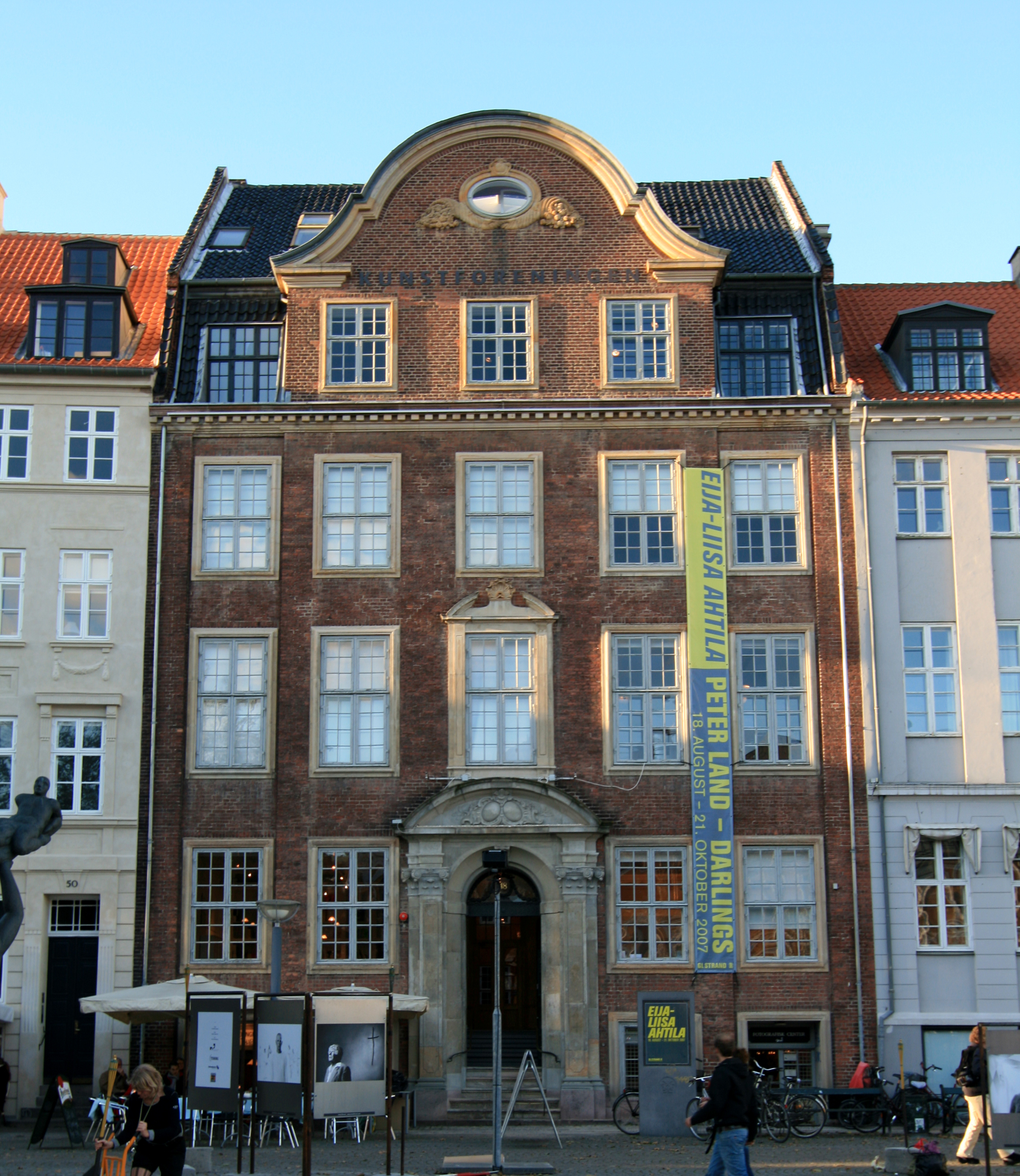
No. 48: Kunstforeningen

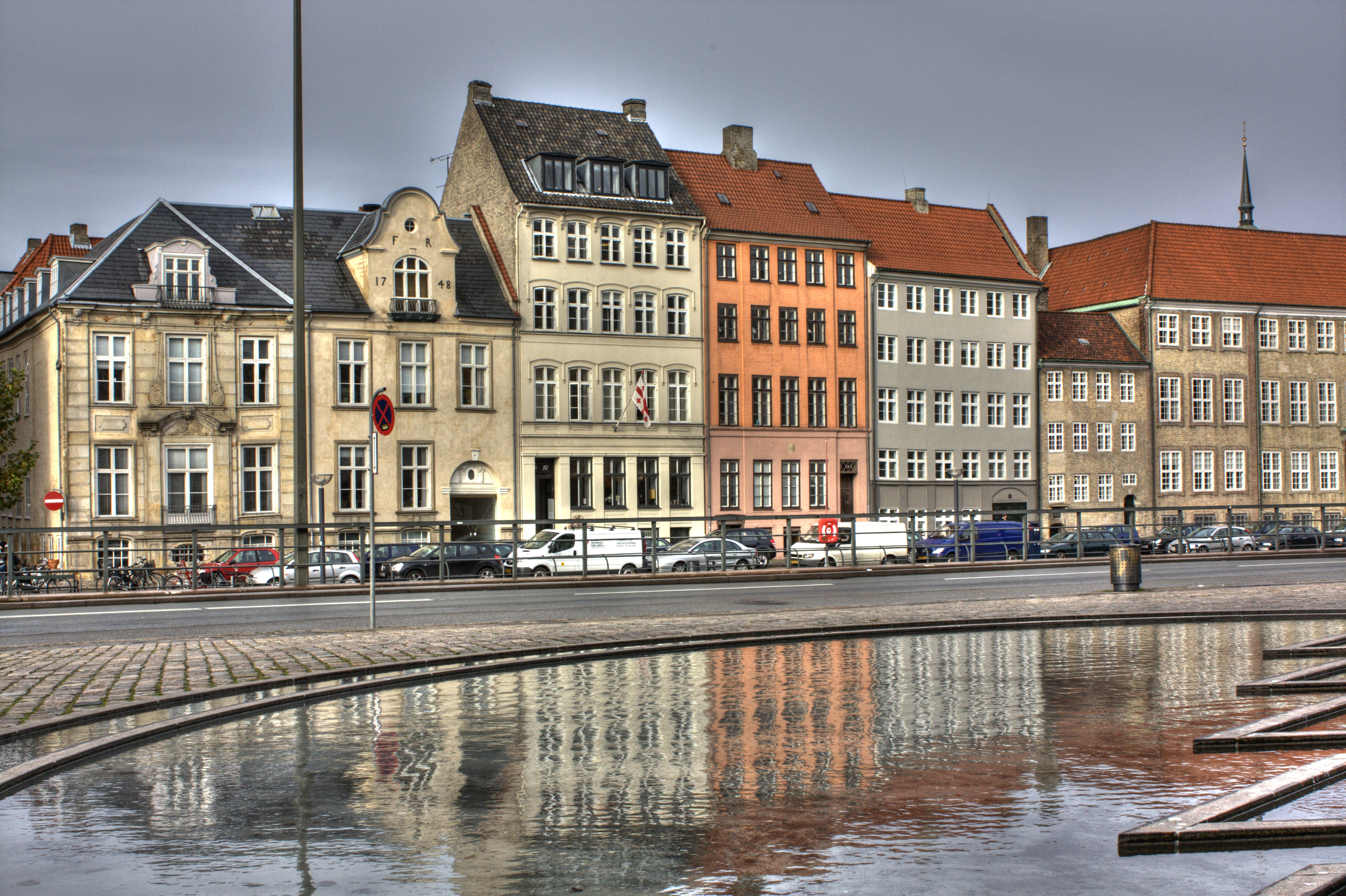
Gammel Strand seen from Bertel Thorvaldsens Plads

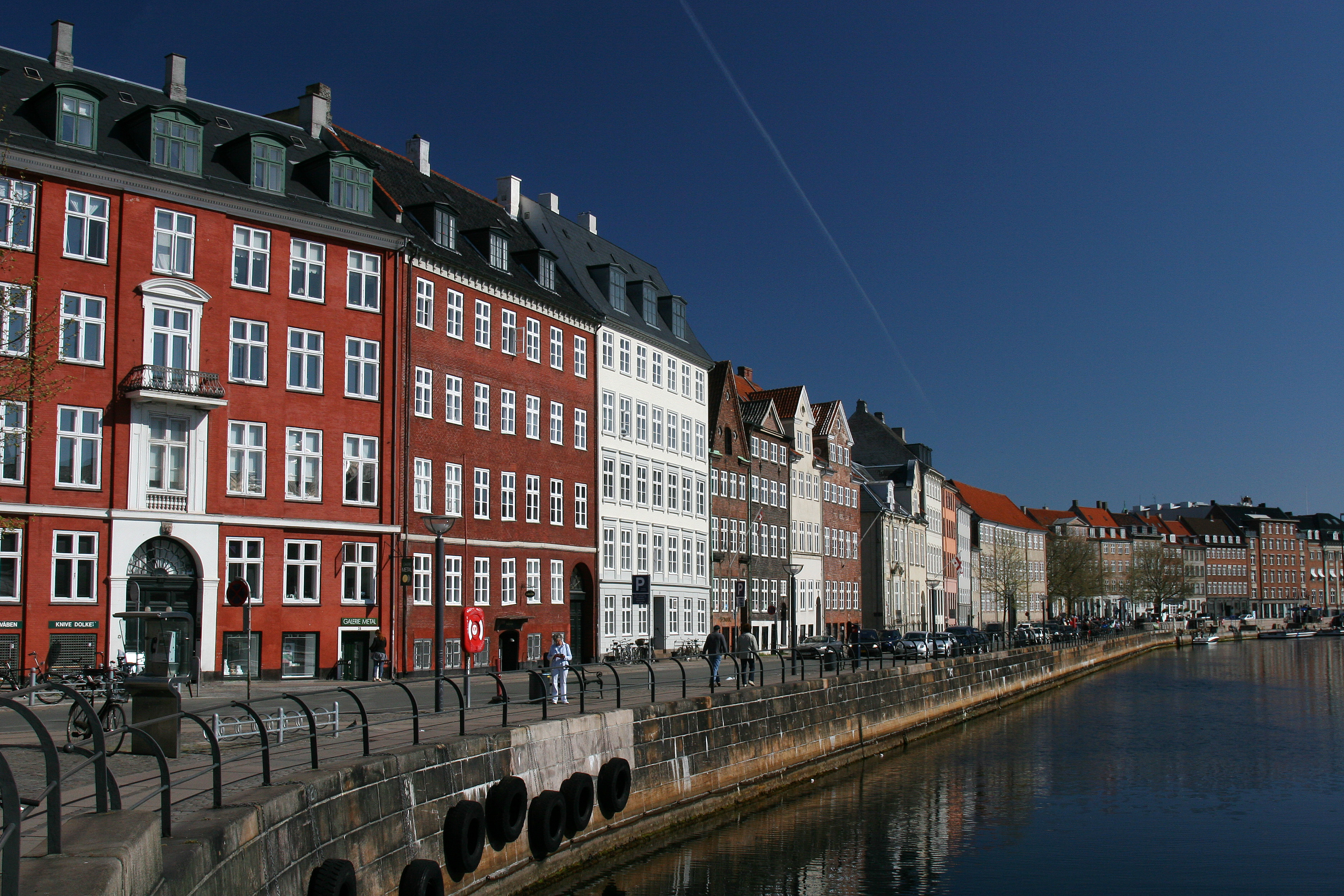
View along Gammel Strand

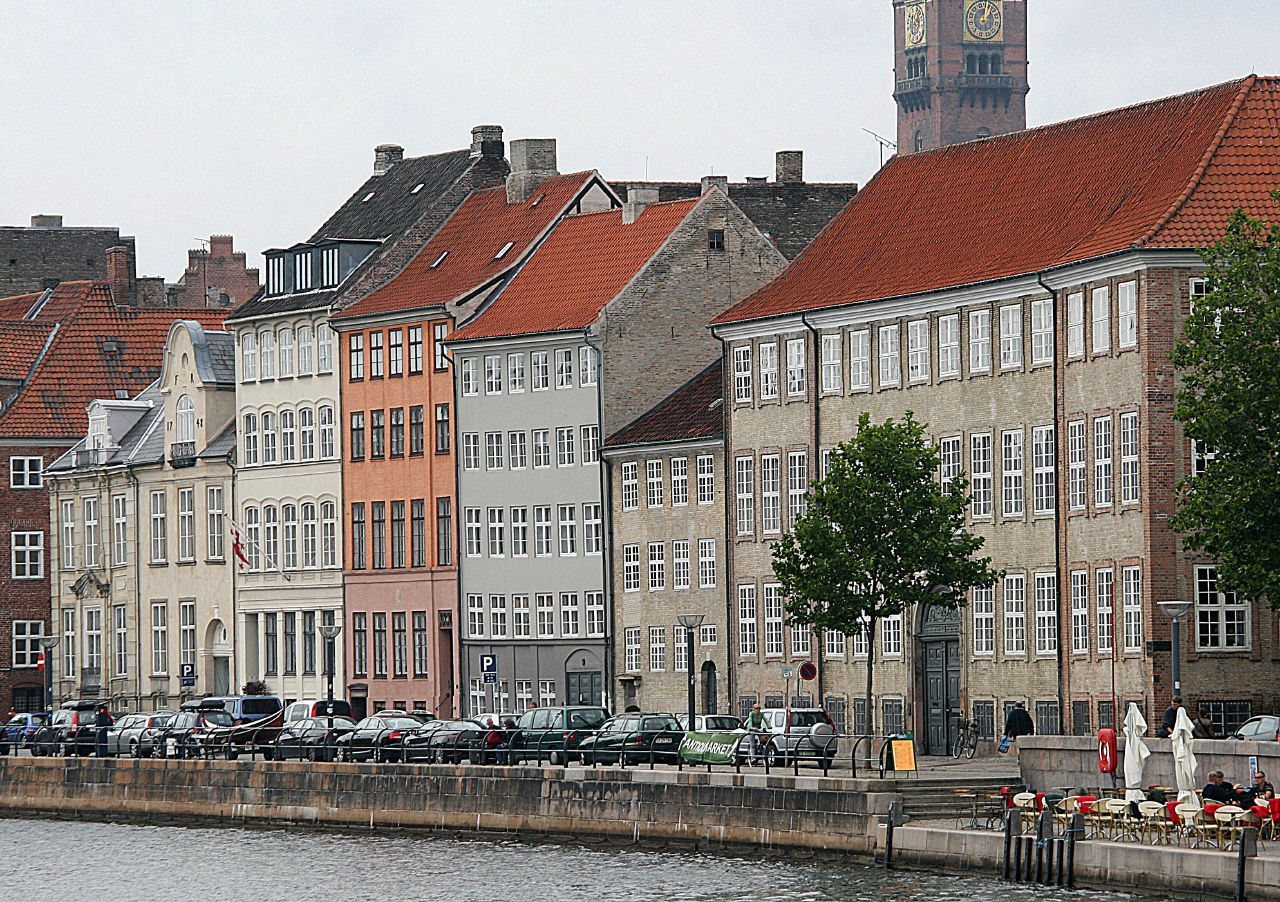
Gammel Strand

== See also ==
- Ved Stranden
- Fishwife (statue)
