= Fillet knife =

Flexible knife used in the preparation of filets

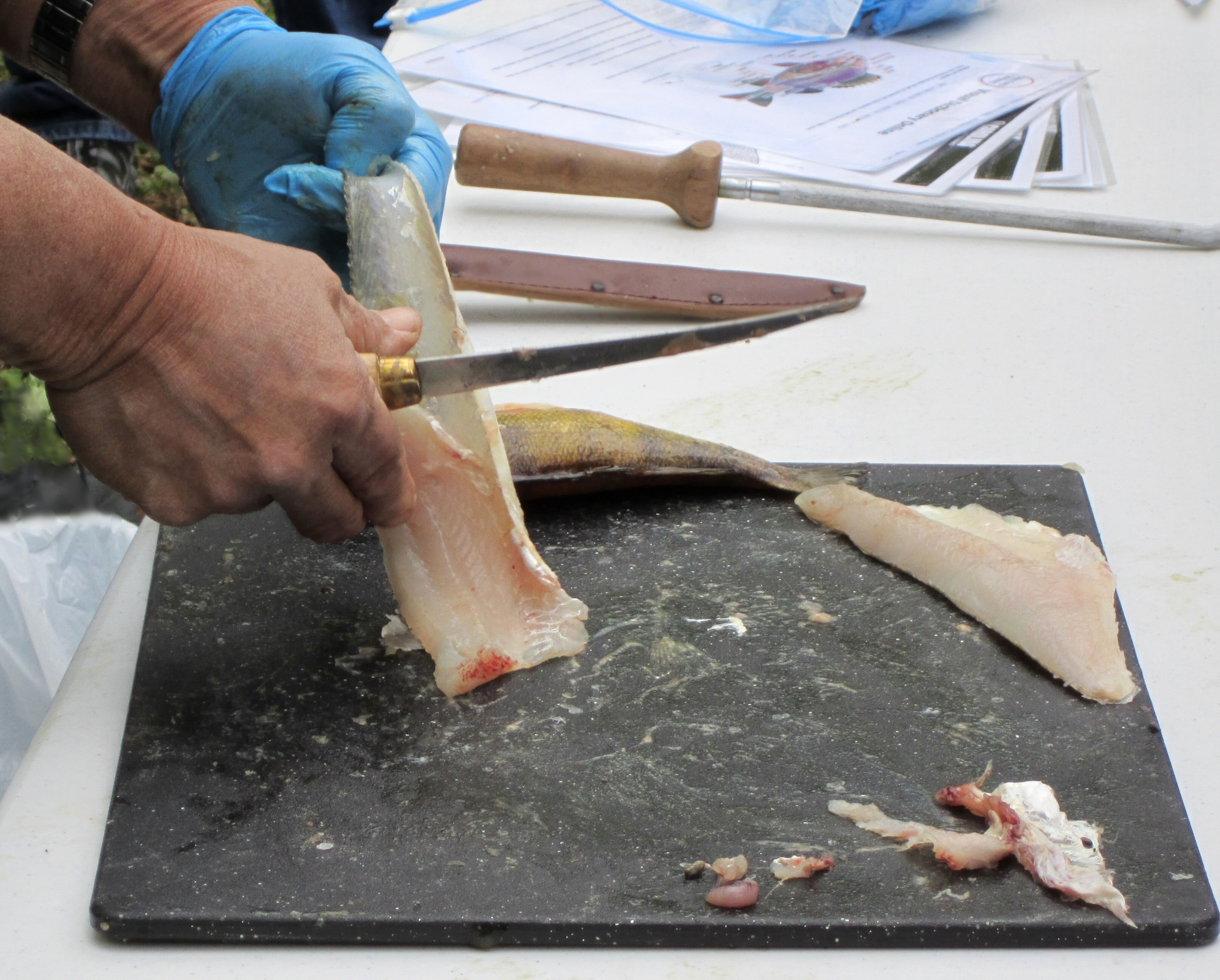
Filleting a fish

A fillet knife (also called a filleting knife) is a kitchen knife used for filleting. It gives good control and aids in filleting. It is a very flexible member of the boning knife family that is used to filet and prepare fish. Fillet knife blades are typically 15 to 28 cm (6 to 11 in) long. This allows them to move easily along the backbone and under the skin of meat.

== Blade ==
Most fillet knives utilize a trailing point blade which is made for slicing and skinning. The back edge of a trailing point blade curves upwards gently from the handle to the tip. The curve of the back edge maximizes the size of the knife belly, the curved part of the cutting edge. The large belly of the trailing point blade makes it ideal for quick precise cuts.

=== Material ===
Fillet knife blades are made of various materials. Stainless steel, such as 420HC or AUS-10, is often used. Since fillet knives are frequently wet, the chromium in stainless steel makes them corrosion-resistant. This also prevents pitting, keeping the blade smooth and easy to clean. Fillet knife blades often have a Rockwell hardness in the mid to upper 50s placing them in the medium hardness range. A medium hardness gives the blade moderate edge retention and relies on the thinness of the blade for flexibility rather than lack of hardness.

=== Thickness ===
The length of the trailing point blade usually dictates the thickness and the amount of flex. The shorter the blade, the thinner and more flexible. The more flex a blade has, the easier it will work around bones and remove skin. All fillet knives must be flexible. Fillet knife blades are made very thin, approximately 2.5–3.5 mm at the spine, so that they can still bend and flex and maintain an edge. If the knife were hard enough to maintain an edge and the blade was thick, the knife would not bend enough to remove the skin from a fillet or work around intricate rib bones. However, if the blade thickness is small, then the blade can be hard enough to maintain sharpness, and still allow flexibility for precise cuts. The thinness of the blade is magnified when the skin is removed from the fillet. The blade must flex when removing skin in order to follow the contours of the fish and create enough separation between the users' hand and the cutting surface that the user can operate the knife safely.

=== Bevel ===
A fillet knife has a bevel that is longer than other types of knives such as pocket, survival, or steak knives. The bevel is typically between 12 and 17 degrees to allow for a razor-sharp edge and a sharp point for puncturing. This bevel angle creates extreme sharpness but sacrifices durability. The shallow angle of the bevel gives the blade a very thin cutting edge that is prone to cracks and chips if it were put through similar uses a knife with a larger bevel angle such as a cleaver. The long bevel allows the blade to maneuver over and around intricate rib and back bones without cutting into or through the bones.

=== Handle ===
Fillet knives operate in wet conditions. The handles must be shaped for maximum grip and use materials that are not affected by wet conditions. Older knives consisted of wooden handles, but rubber and plastics are now being used as well. The shape of the handle is often an elongated teardrop shape with an indention near the base of the blade. This creates a smooth surface to grip, and a place for the user's index finger to rest and prevent the user's hand from accidentally sliding onto the blade. While the basic shape is similar, most manufactures modify the shape to make a unique handle with its own specific features.

== Electric fillet knife ==
An electric fillet knife uses a similar trailing point blade, but the blade is mounted into a motorized handle. The knife resembles a small reciprocating saw. Electric fillet knives allow the user to cut faster than using a traditional fillet knife. Electric fillet knives are usually in the professional setting such as guides and those in the fish processing industry but are readily available to the general public as well. Electric fillet knives can be either corded or cordless, and usually come with multiple blade options. The cordless knives usually use Li-ion batteries.
