= Marretje Arents =

Marretje Arents (c. 1712 – 28 June 1748 Amsterdam), known as Mat van den Nieuwendijk, and het limoenwijf (i.e. the limewoman), was a Dutch fishwife and rebellion leader, sentenced to death as one of the three instigators and leaders responsible for the so-called Pachter riots of 1748.

The Pachter riots were caused by tax conflicts and began in Amsterdam on 17 June 1748. The discontent escalated on 24 June; during two days 19 (or 36) houses of landlords were plundered. Arents was quoted saying that they had plans to conquer the Stadhuis op de Dam (city hall) and proclaim a revolution.
