= South Shields by-election =

South Shields by-election may refer to:

- 1910 South Shields by-election
- 1916 South Shields by-election
- 1918 South Shields by-election
- 2013 South Shields by-election

== See also ==
- South Shields (UK Parliament constituency)
