= Convention (norm) =

Set of agreed, stipulated, or generally accepted standards

A convention influences a set of agreed, stipulated, or generally accepted standards, social norms, or other criteria, often taking the form of a custom.

In physical sciences, numerical values (such as constants, quantities, or scales of measurement) are called conventional if they do not represent a measured property of nature, but originate in a convention, for example an average of many measurements, agreed between the scientists working with these values.

== General ==
A convention is a selection from among two or more alternatives, where the rule or alternative is agreed upon among participants. Often the word refers to unwritten customs shared throughout a community. For instance, it is conventional in many societies that strangers being introduced shake hands. Some conventions are explicitly legislated; for example, it is conventional in the United States and in Germany that motorists drive on the right side of the road, whereas in Australia, New Zealand, Japan, Nepal, India and the United Kingdom motorists drive on the left. The standardization of time is a human convention based on the solar cycle or calendar. The extent to which justice is conventional (as opposed to natural or objective) is historically an important debate among philosophers.

The nature of conventions has raised long-lasting philosophical discussion. Quine, Davidson, and David Lewis published influential writings on the subject. Lewis's account of convention received an extended critique in Margaret Gilbert's On Social Facts (1989), where an alternative account is offered. Another view of convention comes from Ruth Millikan's Language: A Biological Model (2005), once more against Lewis.

According to David Kalupahana, The Buddha described conventions—whether linguistic, social, political, moral, ethical, or even religious—as arising dependent on specific conditions. According to his paradigm, when conventions are considered absolute realities, they contribute to dogmatism, which in turn leads to conflict. This does not mean that conventions should be absolutely ignored as unreal and therefore useless. Instead, according to Buddhist thought, a wise person adopts a Middle Way without holding conventions to be ultimate or ignoring them when they are fruitful.

== Customary or social conventions ==
=== Social ===
In sociology, a social rule refers to any social convention commonly adhered to in a society. These rules are not written in law or otherwise formalized. In social constructionism, there is a great focus on social rules. It is argued that these rules are socially constructed, that these rules act upon every member of a society, but at the same time, are re-produced by the individuals.

Sociologists representing symbolic interactionism argue that social rules are created through the interaction between the members of a society. The focus on active interaction highlights the fluid, shifting character of social rules. These are specific to the social context, a context that varies through time and place. That means a social rule changes over time within the same society. What was acceptable in the past may no longer be the case. Similarly, rules differ across space: what is acceptable in one society may not be so in another.

Social rules reflect what is acceptable or normal behaviour in any situation. Michel Foucault's concept of discourse is closely related to social rules as it offers a possible explanation how these rules are shaped and change. It is the social rules that tell people what is normal behaviour for any specific category. Thus, social rules tell a woman how to behave in a womanly manner, and a man, how to be manly. Other such rules are as follows:

- Strangers being introduced shake hands, as in Western societies, but:
  - Bow toward each other, in Korea, Japan and China
  - Wai each other in Thailand
  - Do not bow at each other, in the Jewish tradition
  - In the United States, eye contact, a nod of the head toward each other, and a smile, with no bowing; the palm of the hand faces sideways, neither upward nor downward, in a business handshake.
  - Present business cards to each other, in business meetings (both-handed in Japan)
- Click heels together, while saluting in some military contexts
- In most places it's always polite to ask before kissing or hugging, this is called public display of affection.
- A property norm is to place things back where we found them.
- A property norm is used to identify which commodities are accepted as money.
- A sexual norm can refer to a personal or a social norm. Most cultures have social norms regarding sexuality, and define normal sexuality to consist only of certain sex acts between individuals who meet specific criteria of age, consanguinity, race/ethnicity, and/or social role and socioeconomic status. In the west outside the traditional norm between consenting adults what is considered not normal is what falls under what is regarded as paraphilia or sexual perversion.
- A form of marriage, polygyny or polyandry, is right or wrong in a given society, as is homosexual marriage considered wrong in many of the societies. A religious more for an example is that a woman or man must not cohabitate, live together, when romantically involved until they have gotten married. Adultery is considered wrong that is not violating sexual fidelity when there is union of a couple in marriage.
- A men's and women's dress code.
- Avoid using rude hand gestures like pointing at people, swear words, offensive language etc.,
- A woman's curtsey in some societies
- In the Middle East, never displaying the sole of the foot toward another, as this would be seen as a grave insult.
- In many schools, though seats for students are not assigned they are still "claimed" by certain students, and sitting in someone else's seat is considered an insult.
- To reciprocate when something is done for us.
- Etiquette norms, like asking to be excused from the gathering's table, be ready to pay for your bill particularly in the case you asked people to dinner, it is a faux pas to refuse an offer of food as a guest.
- Contraception norms, not to limit access to them by women who require it, some cultures limit contraception.
- Recreational drug use restrictions on access or as popularly accepted in the culture where it is used as an example alcohol, nicotine, cannabis and hashish, there is a disincentive and prohibition for controlled substances where use and sale is prohibited like MDMA and party drugs.
- The belief that certain forms of discrimination are unethical because they take something away from the person by restrictions and by being ostracised. Furthermore, can "Restrict women's and girls' rights, access to empowerment opportunities and resources".
- A person has a duty of care for the aged persons within the family. This is particularly true in countries of Asia. Much of aged care falls under unpaid labor.
- Refuse to favor known persons, as this would be an abuse of power relationship.
- Do not make a promise if you know that you can not keep it.
- Do not ask for money if you know that you can not pay it back to that person or place.
- "Practice honesty and not deceive the innocent with false promises to obtain economic benefits or gratuities."
- It is suitable to make a Pledge of Allegiance in the United States, when prompted to in some social contexts.
- An gentlemen's agreement, or gentleman's agreement, is an informal and legally non-binding agreement between two or more parties. We follow through on our business dealings, when we say we will do something then we do it and will not falter to do so.
- Do not divulge the privacy of others.
- Treat friends and family nonviolently, be faithful and honest in a couple, to treat with respect the beliefs, activities or aims of our parents, show respect for beliefs, religious and cultural symbols of others.
- Tolerate and respect people with functional diversity, particularly when they wish to integrate in a game or sports equipment. Also tolerate different points of view than your own, even if contrary, and do not try and change their beliefs by force.
- Give the seat to people with children, pregnant or elderly, in public and private transportation.
- Face the front, do not go elevator surfing, and do not push extra buttons in an elevator or stand too close to someone if there are few people.
- In a library, it is polite to have talk in the same noise volume as that of a classroom.
- In a cinema, it is correct to not talk during a movie because people are there to watch the film, also it is correct to not have phones on as the light and sound will distract other patrons.
- If you are going to be punctual, notify friends or acquaintances if you will be late.
- If you cannot show up to an outing, restaurant, theater, cinema, etc., it's proper to give the reason over your phone or address sometime prior.
- It is a norm to speak one at a time.
- A religious vow is a special promise. It made in a religious sense or in ceremonies such as in marriages when there is a couple who are being promised to marriage called "marriage vows", they are also promising one another to be faithful and take care of their children.
- Helping somebody in need, for social responsibility or to prevent harm. See the parable of the Good Samaritan.
- Do not go to a non-fast food restaurant or bar unless you have enough to make a good tip, depending on the place.
- Examples of US social norms or customs turned into laws include the following:
  - People under 21 cannot buy alcohol.
  - You must be 16 to drive.
  - Firearms are legal and relatively accessible to anyone who wants one.
  - In a city you cannot cross the street wherever you like, you must use a zebra crossing. You can be fined if the police catch you breaking this rule.
  - It is a social norm to provide tips in the US to waitresses and waiters.
- There are numerous gender-specific norms that influence society:
  - Girls should wear pink; boys should wear blue.
  - Men should be strong and not show any emotion.
  - Women should be caring and nurturing.
  - Men should do repairs at the house and be the one to work and make money; while women are expected to take care of the housework and children.
  - A man should pay for the woman's meal when going out to dinner.
  - Men should open doors for women at bars, clubs, workplace, and should clear the way for the exit.

== Government ==
In government, convention is a set of unwritten rules that participants in the government must follow. These rules can be ignored only if justification is clear, or can be provided. Otherwise, consequences follow. Consequences may include ignoring some other convention that has until now been followed. According to the traditional doctrine (Dicey), conventions cannot be enforced in courts, because they are non-legal sets of rules. Convention is particularly important in the Westminster System of government, where many of the rules are unwritten.

== See also ==
- A Dictionary of Slang and Unconventional English
- Conventional electrical unit
- Conventional insulin therapy
- Conventional landing gear
- Conventional pollutant
- Conventional sex
- Conventional superconductor
- Conventional treatment
- Conventional tillage
- Conventional wastewater treatment
- Conventional wisdom
- Conventionalism
- Conventionally grown
- De facto standard
- Non-conventional trademark
- Standard (disambiguation)
- Trope (literature)
- Unconventional computing
- Unconventional superconductor
- Unconventional wind turbines
