= 2013 South Shields by-election =

UK parliamentary by-election

Coordinates: 54°59′56″N 1°25′44″W

- 2 May 2013

The South Shields seat in the House of Commons. Triggered by vacation of seat by incumbent
- Registered: 64,084
- Turnout: 39.3%
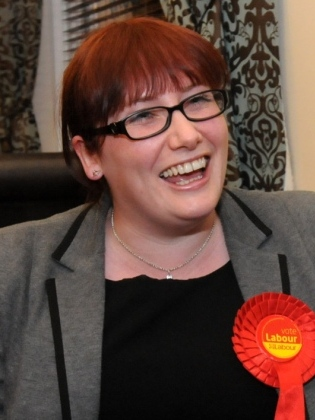
	First party	Second party
		UKI
Candidate	Emma Lewell-Buck	Richard Elvin
Party	Labour	UKIP
Popular vote	12,493	5,988
Percentage	50.4%	24.2%
Swing	▼1.6 pp	New party
	Third party	Fourth party
	Con	Ind
Candidate	Karen Allen	Ahmed Khan
Party	Conservative	Independent
Popular vote	2,857	1,331
Percentage	11.5%	5.4%
Swing	▼10.1 pp	New party
MP before election
David Miliband
Labour
Subsequent MP
Emma Lewell-Buck
Labour

A by-election for the United Kingdom parliamentary constituency of South Shields was held on 2 May 2013, triggered by the resignation of incumbent Labour Party Member of Parliament (MP) and former Foreign Secretary David Miliband in order to take up a position as head of the International Rescue Committee in New York City. It was won by Labour candidate Emma Lewell-Buck who held the seat with 50.4% of the vote.

The UK Independence Party (UKIP) came second with 24.2%, with the Conservatives dropping to third with 11.5%. The Liberal Democrats' candidate came seventh with just 1.4%, the Liberals' or Liberal Democrats' lowest share of the vote at a by-election since 1948. The by-election coincided with local elections across England.

== Resignation of David Miliband ==
The seat became vacant after David Miliband, the incumbent Member of Parliament (MP) and former Foreign Secretary, announced on 27 March 2013 that he intended to resign from Parliament, in order to take up a position as head of the International Rescue Committee in New York City. He had held the seat for Labour since 2001. In an interview with the BBC, he also explained that he "feared" his continued involvement in British politics was a "distraction" to his brother Ed's leadership of the Labour Party. Miliband's resignation was formally announced on 15 April.

== Date ==
The date for the by-election was scheduled for 2 May 2013 to coincide with local elections across England, although none of those local elections were for councils or positions in South Shields – the nearest elections being for the county councils of Durham and Northumberland, and for the directly elected mayor of North Tyneside.

== Candidates and campaign ==
The Labour Party selected South Tyneside councillor Emma Lewell-Buck as its candidate on 10 April 2013. Mark Walsh, a fellow councillor, had been considered the favourite to be selected, but withdrew for "personal reasons" hours before the vote.

The Conservative Party selected the previous 2010 candidate Karen Allen to once again stand for the party on 11 April 2013.

The Liberal Democrats chose Hugh Annand as their candidate on 11 April 2013. Annand had previously stood in North East Hertfordshire and has also been chosen as the seventh candidate on their East of England party-list for the 2014 European elections.

The UK Independence Party announced on 7 April 2013 that Richard Elvin would be their candidate. Elvin finished second in the 2012 Middlesbrough by-election with 12% of the vote.

Alan "Howling Laud" Hope, the leader of the Official Monster Raving Loony Party and perennial by-election candidate, stood as the party's candidate.

Comedian Simon Brodkin, in character as Lee Nelson, was duly nominated as a candidate for 'Lee Nelson's Well Good Party', but then withdrew his nomination.

== Result ==
Election	Political result	Candidate	Party	Votes	%	±%
South Shields by-election, 2013; Resignation of David Miliband; Electorate: 62,979; Turnout: 24,780 (39.3%) −18.4	Labour hold Majority: 6,505 (26.2%) −4.2	Emma Lewell-Buck	Labour	12,493	50.4	−1.6
South Shields by-election, 2013; Resignation of David Miliband; Electorate: 62,979; Turnout: 24,780 (39.3%) −18.4	Labour hold Majority: 6,505 (26.2%) −4.2	Richard Elvin	UKIP	5,988	24.2	New
South Shields by-election, 2013; Resignation of David Miliband; Electorate: 62,979; Turnout: 24,780 (39.3%) −18.4	Labour hold Majority: 6,505 (26.2%) −4.2	Karen Allen	Conservative	2,857	11.5	−10.1
South Shields by-election, 2013; Resignation of David Miliband; Electorate: 62,979; Turnout: 24,780 (39.3%) −18.4	Labour hold Majority: 6,505 (26.2%) −4.2	Ahmed Khan	Independent	1,331	5.4	N/A
South Shields by-election, 2013; Resignation of David Miliband; Electorate: 62,979; Turnout: 24,780 (39.3%) −18.4	Labour hold Majority: 6,505 (26.2%) −4.2	Phil Brown	Independent Socialist Party	750	3.0	New
South Shields by-election, 2013; Resignation of David Miliband; Electorate: 62,979; Turnout: 24,780 (39.3%) −18.4	Labour hold Majority: 6,505 (26.2%) −4.2	Dorothy Brookes	BNP	711	2.9	−3.6
South Shields by-election, 2013; Resignation of David Miliband; Electorate: 62,979; Turnout: 24,780 (39.3%) −18.4	Labour hold Majority: 6,505 (26.2%) −4.2	Hugh Annand	Liberal Democrats	352	1.4	−12.8
South Shields by-election, 2013; Resignation of David Miliband; Electorate: 62,979; Turnout: 24,780 (39.3%) −18.4	Labour hold Majority: 6,505 (26.2%) −4.2	Alan "Howling Laud" Hope	Monster Raving Loony	197	0.8	New
South Shields by-election, 2013; Resignation of David Miliband; Electorate: 62,979; Turnout: 24,780 (39.3%) −18.4	Labour hold Majority: 6,505 (26.2%) −4.2	Thomas Darwood	Independent	57	0.2	N/A
General Election 2010; Electorate: 64,084; Turnout: 36,518 (57.7%) +7.0	Labour hold Majority: 11,109 (30.4%) −10.4; Swing: −6.4% from Lab to Con	David Miliband	Labour	18,995	52.0	-8.8
General Election 2010; Electorate: 64,084; Turnout: 36,518 (57.7%) +7.0	Labour hold Majority: 11,109 (30.4%) −10.4; Swing: −6.4% from Lab to Con	Karen Allen	Conservative	7,886	21.6	+4.0
General Election 2010; Electorate: 64,084; Turnout: 36,518 (57.7%) +7.0	Labour hold Majority: 11,109 (30.4%) −10.4; Swing: −6.4% from Lab to Con	Stephen Psallidas	Liberal Democrats	5,189	14.2	-5.0
General Election 2010; Electorate: 64,084; Turnout: 36,518 (57.7%) +7.0	Labour hold Majority: 11,109 (30.4%) −10.4; Swing: −6.4% from Lab to Con	Donna Watson	BNP	2,382	6.5	New
General Election 2010; Electorate: 64,084; Turnout: 36,518 (57.7%) +7.0	Labour hold Majority: 11,109 (30.4%) −10.4; Swing: −6.4% from Lab to Con	Shirley Ford	Green	762	2.1	New
General Election 2010; Electorate: 64,084; Turnout: 36,518 (57.7%) +7.0	Labour hold Majority: 11,109 (30.4%) −10.4; Swing: −6.4% from Lab to Con	Siamak Kaikavoosi	Independent	729	2.0	New
General Election 2010; Electorate: 64,084; Turnout: 36,518 (57.7%) +7.0	Labour hold Majority: 11,109 (30.4%) −10.4; Swing: −6.4% from Lab to Con	Victor Thompson	Independent	316	0.9	New
General Election 2010; Electorate: 64,084; Turnout: 36,518 (57.7%) +7.0	Labour hold Majority: 11,109 (30.4%) −10.4; Swing: −6.4% from Lab to Con	Sam Navabi	Independent	168	0.5	New
General Election 2010; Electorate: 64,084; Turnout: 36,518 (57.7%) +7.0	Labour hold Majority: 11,109 (30.4%) −10.4; Swing: −6.4% from Lab to Con	Roger Nettleship	Fight for an Anti-War Government	91	0.2	New

== See also ==
- 2013 United Kingdom local elections
- 1918 South Shields by-election
- 1916 South Shields by-election
- 1910 South Shields by-election
- List of United Kingdom by-elections
