= Henry Terrell =

Henry Terrell may refer to:

- Henry Terrell (politician) (1856–1944), British member of parliament
- Henry Terrell Jr. (1890–1971), United States Army officer
