= David Miliband =

British former politician (born 1965)

The Right Honourable David Miliband
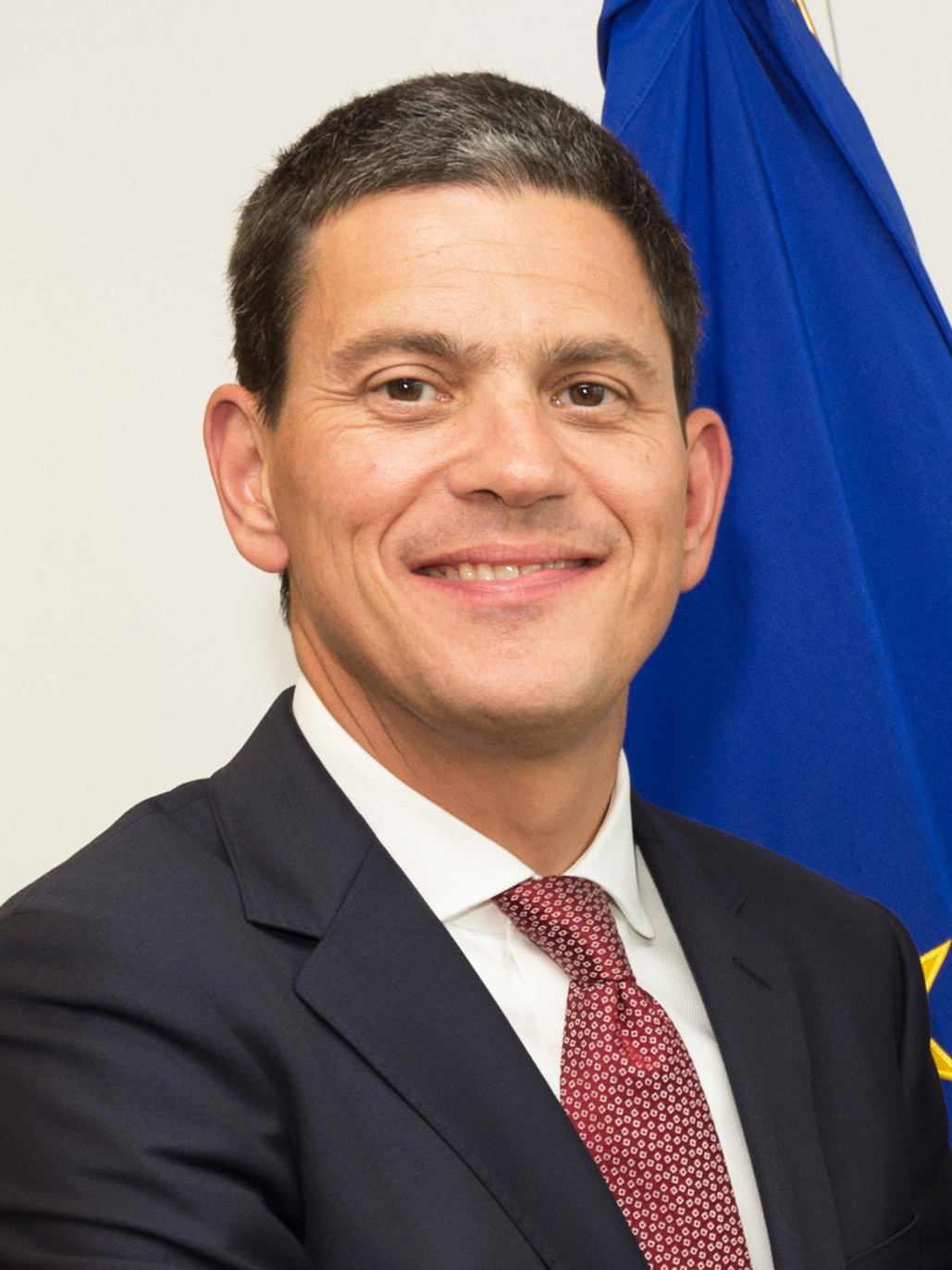
- Miliband in 2016

President of the International Rescue Committee
- Incumbent
- Assumed office 1 September 2013
- Preceded by: George Erik Rupp

Foreign Secretary
- In office 28 June 2007 – 11 May 2010
- Prime Minister: Gordon Brown
- Preceded by: Margaret Beckett
- Succeeded by: William Hague

Secretary of State for Environment, Food and Rural Affairs
- In office 5 May 2006 – 28 June 2007
- Prime Minister: Tony Blair
- Preceded by: Margaret Beckett
- Succeeded by: Hilary Benn

Minister of Communities and Local Government
- In office 6 May 2005 – 5 May 2006
- Prime Minister: Tony Blair
- Preceded by: Office established
- Succeeded by: Ruth Kelly
Junior ministerial offices
Minister of State for the Cabinet Office
In office 15 December 2004 – 6 May 2005
| Prime Minister | Tony Blair |
| Preceded by | Douglas Alexander (2003) |
| Succeeded by | David Laws (2012) |
Minister of State for Schools
In office 30 May 2002 – 15 December 2004
| Prime Minister | Tony Blair |
| Preceded by | Stephen Timms |
| Succeeded by | Stephen Twigg |
Shadow Cabinet posts
Shadow Foreign Secretary
In office 12 May 2010 – 8 October 2010
| Leader | Harriet Harman (acting); Ed Miliband |
| Preceded by | William Hague |
| Succeeded by | Yvette Cooper |

Member of Parliament for South Shields
- In office 7 June 2001 – 15 April 2013
- Preceded by: David Clark
- Succeeded by: Emma Lewell-Buck

Director of the Number 10 Policy Unit
- In office 2 May 1997 – 7 June 2001
- Prime Minister: Tony Blair
- Preceded by: Norman Blackwell
- Succeeded by: Andrew Adonis

Personal details
- Born: David Wright Miliband; 15 July 1965 (age 61) London, England
- Party: Labour
- Spouse: Louise Shackelton (m. 1998)
- Children: 2
- Parents: Ralph Miliband; Marion Kozak
- Relatives: Ed Miliband (brother)
- Education: Corpus Christi College, Oxford (BA); Massachusetts Institute of Technology (SM)
- Awards: Kennedy Scholarship (1988)

David Wright Miliband (born 15 July 1965) is a British former politician serving as President of the International Rescue Committee since 2013. He was the Foreign Secretary from 2007 to 2010 and the Member of Parliament (MP) for South Shields in North East England from 2001 to 2013. He and his brother, Ed Miliband, were the first siblings to sit in the Cabinet simultaneously since Edward, Lord Stanley and Oliver Stanley in 1938. He was a candidate for Labour Party leadership in 2010, following the resignation of Gordon Brown, but was defeated by his brother and subsequently left politics.

Miliband started his career at the Institute for Public Policy Research. Aged 29, he became Tony Blair's Head of Policy while the Labour Party was in opposition, and he was a contributor to Labour's manifesto for the 1997 election, which brought the party to power. Blair subsequently made him head of the Prime Minister's Policy Unit from 1997 to 2001, at which point Miliband was elected to Parliament for the seat of South Shields.

Miliband spent the next few years in various junior ministerial posts, including at the Department for Education and Skills, before joining the Cabinet in 2006 as Environment Secretary. His tenure in this post saw climate change consolidated as a priority for policymakers and on the succession of Gordon Brown as Prime Minister in 2007, Miliband was promoted to become Foreign Secretary. At the age of 41, he became the youngest person to hold that office since David Owen 30 years earlier. In September 2010, Miliband narrowly lost the Labour leadership election to his brother Ed. On 29 September 2010, he announced that to avoid "constant comparison" with his brother, and because of the "perpetual, distracting and destructive attempts to find division where there is none, and splits where they don't exist, all to the detriment of the party's cause", he would not stand for the Shadow Cabinet.

On 15 April 2013, Miliband resigned from Parliament in order to take up the posts of President and CEO of the International Rescue Committee in New York City, which triggered a by-election in South Shields.

== Early life and education ==
=== Early life and family ===
Born in London, Miliband is the elder son of immigrant parents, Belgian-born Marxist sociologist Ralph Miliband and Polish-born Marion Kozak, both from Polish Jewish families. The latter was a teacher before she became a homemaker. He was given the middle name of "Wright" after the American sociologist C. Wright Mills, a friend of his father. He has said "I am the child of Jewish immigrants and that is a very important part of my identity." Both his Polish Jewish paternal grandparents lived in the Jewish quarter of Warsaw. His paternal grandfather, Samuel, a trained leather worker, served in the Red Army in the Polish–Soviet War of 1919–1921 before moving to Belgium. His paternal grandmother, Renia (later known as Renée), also moved to Belgium, where she first met Sam, and the couple married in 1923. The German invasion of Belgium in May 1940 split the Miliband family in half: Ralph and father Samuel fled to England, while Ralph's mother Renée and baby sister Nan stayed behind for the duration of the war. They were not reunited until 1950. His mother, a human rights campaigner and early CND member, survived the Holocaust thanks to being protected by Catholic Poles but her father, David's maternal grandfather did not. During his visit to Poland in June 2009, Miliband went to his family tomb in the Jewish Cemetery in Warsaw. He said of Poland, "My mother was born here, her life was saved by those who risked theirs sheltering her from Nazi oppression", and that he is "one of the million Britons who have Polish blood".

=== Education ===
Miliband was educated at Primrose Hill Primary School, in Camden, and Newlaithes Primary School, in Leeds. In September 1976, he passed the entrance examination to the independent, fee-paying Bradford Grammar School, studying there from 1976 to 1978 and from 1978 to 1983, attended Haverstock Comprehensive School in north London. He obtained four A-levels (grades BBBD), and won admission to the University of Oxford. He was an undergraduate student at Corpus Christi College, Oxford, and obtained a first-class honours degree in Philosophy, Politics and Economics (PPE). From 1988 to 1989, he received a master's degree in Political Science at Massachusetts Institute of Technology, where he was a Kennedy Scholar.

== Political biography ==
Miliband's first job was as a political analyst at the National Council for Voluntary Organisations (NCVO). From 1989 to 1994, he worked as a Research Fellow and policy analyst at the Institute for Public Policy Research (IPPR). He was appointed Secretary of the IPPR's Commission on Social Justice upon its foundation in 1992 by the then leader of the Labour Party, John Smith.

=== Policy adviser to Tony Blair (1994–2001) ===
In 1994 Miliband became Tony Blair's Head of Policy and was a contributor to Labour's manifesto for the 1997 general election. Following Labour's victory in that election, Blair made him the de facto head of the Prime Minister's Policy Unit, a position which he held until the 2001 election. He was given the nickname "Brains" by Alastair Campbell, after the Thunderbirds character.

=== Member of Parliament ===
In the 2001 general election he was elected to Parliament for the Labour stronghold of South Shields, succeeding David Clark. After a year as a backbench MP he was appointed Schools Minister, a junior minister in the Department for Education and Skills in June 2002.

In 2003, Miliband voted to go to war in Iraq. Later, in 2010, he said that his decision was based on his belief that Iraq then had weapons of mass destruction.

On 15 December 2004, in the reshuffle following the resignation of David Blunkett, he replaced Ruth Kelly as a Cabinet Office Minister.

Following Labour's third consecutive election victory in May 2005, he was promoted to the Cabinet as Minister of Communities and Local Government within the Office of the Deputy Prime Minister. This was a newly created cabinet-level post with responsibility for housing, planning, regeneration and local government. Because the Deputy Prime Minister, John Prescott, was the Departmental Minister officially in charge of these portfolios, Miliband was not given the title Secretary of State but he was appointed a Privy Councillor and became a full member of the Cabinet.

=== Environment Secretary (2006–2007) ===
On 5 May 2006, following the local elections, Tony Blair made a major cabinet reshuffle in which Miliband replaced Margaret Beckett as Secretary of State for Environment, Food and Rural Affairs. Miliband has said he believes agriculture is important for the UK's cultural heritage, economy and society and also for the environment. He has said disease control should be balanced with animal welfare. He attaches importance to reaching a "fair balance" among consumers, farmers, manufacturers and retailers. Miliband also believes the European Union and the World Trade Organization affect power relations between British and foreign farmers.

He was the first British cabinet member to have a blog, though claims of excessive cost to the taxpayer provoked some controversy. In January 2007 Miliband sparked minor controversy by saying there was no evidence organic food was better than conventionally grown produce, though he later clarified that he was referring specifically to health benefits.

Miliband is an advocate for international awareness of Climate change and believes the cooperation of all nations is needed for environmental reform. Miliband's focuses include food retail waste management and greenhouse gas emissions in agricultural industries. He believes that the EU should go further in two areas: a low carbon global economy and global action on climate change. He also wants Europe to increase its economic competitiveness. By switching over to a low-carbon economy, he plans to tackle climate change. He hopes to ensure a stable price on energy by securing an energy source and announced the Government's plans to legislate for carbon reductions at the United Nations General Assembly.

In August 2006, in an effort to put environmental reform into action, Miliband developed a place for a collaborative "environmental contract" to be developed on a Defra Wiki site. It was subsequently linked to by blogger Paul Staines, and mocked, after which further edits by guest users were temporarily prevented. Miliband's emphasis on the necessity of an entirely cooperative effort to effectively instigate a low carbon lifestyle worldwide has led him to advocate an open dialogue among citizens about environmental issues through web-based blogging. Whilst Environment Secretary, Miliband called for all 27 nations of the European Union to unify in backing proposals to cut harmful emissions by 30% by 2020.

Miliband has floated the idea of every citizen being issued with a "Carbon Credit Card" to improve personal carbon thrift. Miliband argues individuals have to be empowered to tackle climate change — "the mass mobilising movement of our age".

=== Foreign Secretary (2007–2010) ===
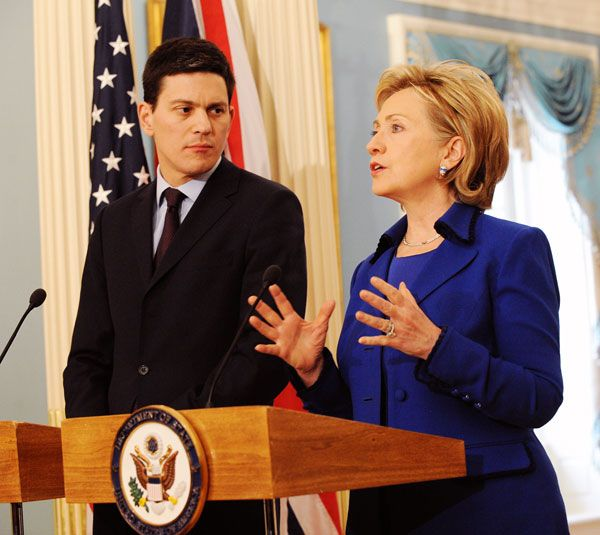
Miliband with U.S. Secretary of State Hillary Clinton, February 2009

On 28 June 2007, the day after Gordon Brown became Prime Minister, Miliband was appointed Foreign Secretary. He was Britain's third youngest Foreign Secretary and the youngest person to be appointed to the post since David Owen (in office 21 February 1977 – 4 May 1979). Anthony Eden had assumed office at the age of 37 in 1935. David's younger brother, the economist Ed Miliband, was the Secretary of State for Energy and Climate Change, making them the first siblings to serve together in Cabinet since Edward, Lord Stanley, and his brother Oliver in 1938.

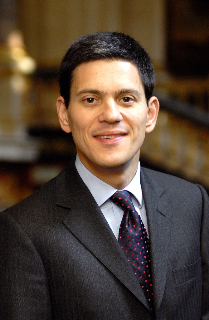
Miliband whilst Foreign Secretary

Miliband's first Foreign Office questions session as Foreign Secretary in the House of Commons was on 3 July 2007. On the morning of 13 December 2007, Miliband stood in for Prime Minister Gordon Brown at the official signing ceremony in Lisbon of the EU Reform Treaty, which was attended by all other European heads of government. Brown was otherwise engaged at the House of Commons, appearing before the Liaison Committee, and travelled to Portugal to sign the treaty in the afternoon. He was left on his own again by the Prime Minister to speak in favour of the European Union (Amendment) Bill in the House on 21 January 2008.

On 21 February 2008, Miliband admitted (despite previous government denials) that two U.S. extraordinary rendition flights had stopped on Diego Garcia, a U.K. territory, in 2002. When questioned as to whether the government had deliberately misled the public over rendition, Miliband apologised and stated that the government had "made a mistake".

On 5 February 2009, Miliband made a statement to the House of Commons concerning Guantanamo Bay detainee and former British resident Binyam Mohamed. A week later Mohamed's American lawyer Yvonne Bradley flew to Britain to urge the Foreign Office to press harder for his release. On 23 February 2009, Benyam Mohammed returned to Britain and was granted temporary residence. However, in July 2010, Clive Stafford Smith accused former Foreign Secretary David Miliband of "fighting tooth and nail" to prevent the release of vital documents during the Binyam Mohamed case.

==== India trip ====
Following his trip to India in 2008 in the wake of the Mumbai attacks, Miliband wrote in an article that "resolution of the dispute over Kashmir would help deny extremists in the region one of their main calls to arms, and allow Pakistani authorities to focus more effectively on tackling the threat on their western borders". This sparked an angry response from the Indian government, whose long standing policy had been not to accept any third party involvement in the dispute over Kashmir. An Indian analyst suggested that his tone implied that India must shoulder some of the responsibility because of its policies in Kashmir. Some reports also said that Miliband's tone towards the Indian Prime Minister and the Finance Minister had been aggressive, and that he had been excused for being a "young man".

==== Sri Lanka ceasefire ====
During the latter stages of the Sri Lankan Army's 2008–09 offensive against the LTTE, Miliband travelled to Sri Lanka to press the government to call a ceasefire with the Tamil Tigers, citing concerns for civilians caught in the crossfire. Miliband's visit was met with protests by Sri Lankan nationalists, who accused Miliband of attempting to save the lives of Tamil Tiger militants. During the victory celebrations that took place a few weeks later, a burning effigy of Miliband was reported to have been tossed over the gate of the British High Commission in Colombo.

In December 2010 articles published in the British newspapers The Guardian and The Daily Telegraph highlighted that Miliband was spending two-thirds of his time focusing on the Sri Lankan civil war, largely due to domestic political calculations. The source of the articles was a leaked US diplomatic cable. The articles quoted Tim Waite, a Foreign Office official as saying

that much of [Her Majesty's government] and ministerial attention to Sri Lanka is due to the "very vocal" Tamil diaspora in the UK, numbering over 300,000, who had been protesting in front of Parliament since 6 April.

According to Wikileaks, this was reported by Richard Mills a United States Embassy worker in UK. Richard Mills further wrote on his cable, saying that

with UK elections on the horizon and many Tamils living in Labour constituencies with slim majorities, the government is paying particular attention to Sri Lanka, with Miliband recently remarking to Waite that he was spending 60 per cent of his time at the moment on Sri Lanka.

==== Comments over terrorism ====
In August 2009, Miliband was a guest on BBC Radio 4's Great Lives programme, choosing South African Communist Party leader and anti-apartheid activist Joe Slovo. Miliband stated during the programme, in a response to a question about terrorism, that "yes, there are circumstances in which it is justifiable and yes, there are circumstances in which it is effective, but it is never effective on its own". These comments were criticised by Menzies Campbell and William Hague.

==== European Foreign Minister ====
The Treaty of Lisbon created the post of High Representative of the Union for Foreign Affairs and Security Policy for the European Union, a post commonly known as the European Foreign Minister. In autumn 2009, as the treaty came close to coming into force, Miliband was named as being under consideration for the post as EU officials regarded him as "ideal material". Miliband publicly insisted that he was not available to fill the post, as he was committed to remaining in the British cabinet. Baroness Ashton, a fellow British Labour politician and then European Commissioner for Trade, was ultimately appointed to the post instead.

==== Relations with Israel ====
On 23 March 2010, the UK expelled an Israeli diplomat owing to claims that an embassy official from that country forged passports, relating to the assassination of Mahmoud Al-Mabhouh, and Miliband gave a public warning against travel to Israel because of identity theft concerns.

== 2010 Labour leadership election ==
=== Background ===
On 29 July 2008, Miliband wrote an article in The Guardian that outlined his vision of a future of the Labour Party but made no mention of Gordon Brown. The piece was widely interpreted as a leadership challenge to the then Prime Minister, not least because the timing of its publication – just after Brown's departure on holiday at the start of the parliamentary summer recess, and while there was intense speculation about his continuing leadership following Labour's defeat in the Glasgow East by-election the previous week – seemed designed to produce a large political impact. In the following days two Labour MPs called on Brown to sack Miliband for his perceived disloyalty. Miliband, while denying claims by his detractors that he was seeking to provoke an early leadership election, did not rule himself out of eventually running for the leadership of the party. Many grassroots supporters believed a David Miliband-led Labour Party would tackle the Conservatives more effectively, reaching out to voters in marginal seats as well as securing Labour's core support. In fact, The New Statesman said Miliband was then "holding an unofficial title: he was Labour's leader in waiting, and the only man thought capable of toppling Gordon Brown."

==== Campaign ====
The Labour Party lost the general election held on 6 May 2010, and Gordon Brown soon announced that he was standing down as leader of the party.

On 12 May, flanked by 15 supportive members of the parliamentary party, Miliband announced from outside the House of Commons that he would stand in the resulting leadership election. On 10 June 2010, Barry Sheerman, Huddersfield MP, nominated Miliband for the Labour Party leadership post with Mr. Sheerman's daughter, Madlin Sadler, as Miliband's Campaign Co-ordinator. Madlin Sadler had served under Miliband previously as Special Advisor.

The other contenders for the leadership were Ed Balls, Andy Burnham, Diane Abbott and David's brother Ed Miliband, with David Miliband gaining the most nominations. The result of the contest was announced on 25 September 2010, the day before the start of the 2010 Labour Party Conference in Manchester. While David Miliband led the share of the electoral college votes in the first three rounds, he lost in the final round (50.65% to 49.35%) to his brother Ed. He announced on 29 September 2010 that he would be quitting frontline politics and would not be a part of his brother Ed's shadow cabinet.

=== Retirement from politics ===
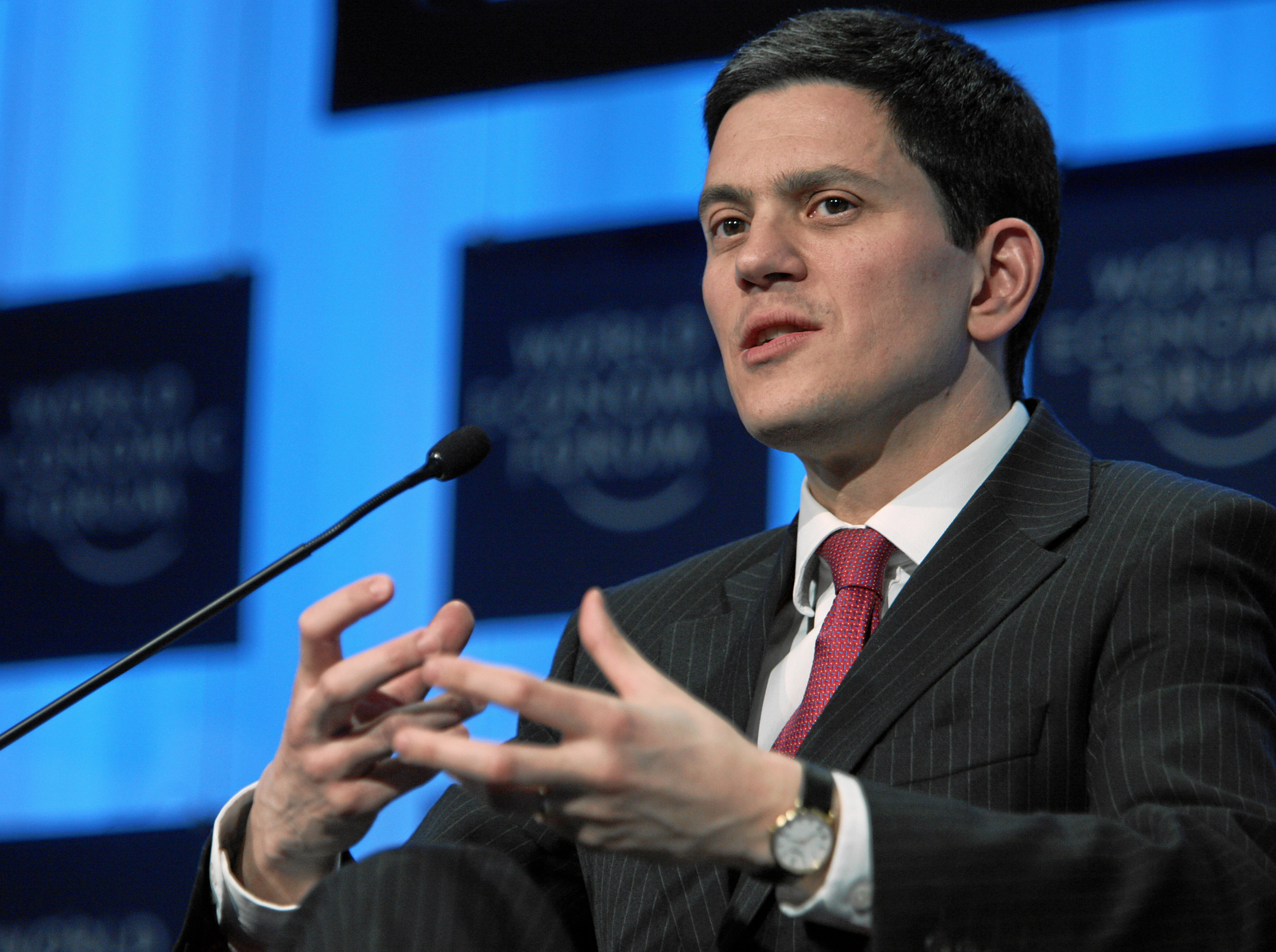
Miliband during the WEF 2010

Miliband resigned from the shadow cabinet in October 2010, but continued to serve as the MP for South Shields. He also taught A-Level Government and Politics on a voluntary basis at Haverstock School. In 2011, he became Senior Global Advisor for Oxford Analytica.

In May 2018, Miliband joined Nick Clegg and Nicky Morgan in calling for a soft Brexit.

In September 2026, he declined to stand in the Labour candidate selection for the 2026 Holborn and St Pancras by-election, caused by the resignation of Keir Starmer.

== Leadership of the International Rescue Committee ==
On 26 March 2013 the Daily Mirror reported that Miliband would be announcing the following day that he intended to resign as an MP and leave politics altogether. He announced that he was taking up the post of head of the International Rescue Committee in New York, for which his remuneration would be £300,000 ($450,000) a year. It was reported that his total IRC remuneration for 2019 was c. $1 million.

According to tax filings hosted by ProPublica Nonprofit Explorer, the International Rescue Committee CEO salary was $466,209 in financial year ending September 2012. In financial year ending September 2022, the salary was $1,142,413.

Miliband became the president and CEO of the International Rescue Committee on 1 September 2013. At the IRC, Miliband has been overseeing humanitarian aid and development programs in 40 countries, a global staff of 12,000 and 1,300 volunteers, and an annual budget of $450 million. Near the top of the IRC, Miliband again installed his former Special Political Advisor from London, Madlin Sadler. She became the aid agency's Chief of Staff.

In February 2025, addressing the American House Foreign Affairs Committee as Chairman, Brian Mast cited David Miliband's salary as CEO of International Rescue Committee at $1.2m per year. In his comments, Chairman Mast stated that the "grift" via USAID grants (of which IRC was a recipient) was a slap in the face for every American who gets up and goes to work. Americans should be able to expect their tax dollars to be used for their benefit, not paying for high salaries for former British Members of Parliament or being sent abroad for random use.

=== Syria's civil war ===
The IRC has been responding to Syria's refugee crisis. On the ABC News programme of 13 October 2013, This Week with George Stephanopoulos, Miliband commented that he worried about the immediate effects of the current diplomatic solution in Syria of sending in Chemical Weapons Inspectors and destroying the chemical stockpiles would have on the ongoing crisis. He said: "We're concerned that people think that somehow, because the chemical weapons seem to be addressed, that the Syrian conflict, the regional conflict, is done and dusted." On 10 October 2013, he said there were huge risks in not intervening militarily. "We've got people on the ground, not just in Syria but in Turkey, Lebanon, Jordan and Iraq," he told a foreign policy discussion in Manhattan. "I've got people who are in danger." He quoted Frederick the Great, saying: "Diplomacy without weapons is like music without instruments". His policy opinions were at odds with his younger brother, Ed Miliband, the Labour Party's Leader in the UK who insisted that the Labour Party would not back military intervention.

On 28 February 2014, in a TV interview with KPBS Evening Edition in San Diego, Miliband reiterated that the US and other nations needed to intervene "both politically as well as financially" in Syria where one in two Syrians was displaced because the government of Bashar al-Assad was "dropping barrel bombs on its own citizens".

On KPBS, he revealed that the IRC was running cross-border aid to Syrians beyond the scope of the United Nations. Miliband said such "cross border aid" has reached about a half million Syrians with medical aid in cities that were "besieged and cut off from the UN help". Another half million Syrians, said Miliband, had received non-medical aid. Miliband stated that in the UN's absence, "It comes to International NGOs, non governmental organisations, to get across the border crossings and weave their way between the conflict lines to reach people." He stated the need for such extraordinary efforts was great and the need for such ingenuity was even greater.

=== Typhoon Haiyan ===
On 10 November 2013, as IRC CEO, Miliband ordered the war relief agency to mount an emergency response to a natural disaster—Typhoon Haiyan in the Philippines. He announced a huge donation drive for funds dedicated exclusively to the storm: "In the face of a rising death toll and widespread humanitarian catastrophe the International Rescue Committee (IRC) has dispatched an emergency team to Manila and launched a $10 million appeal in order to implement the most appropriate response. We have today taken the decision to deploy emergency relief coordinators to the Philippines, with a view to deciding with the host government which of IRC's areas of expertise — from water and sanitation to education — are most needed. The IRC's emergency unit will start work immediately."

Miliband is co-chair of the Global Ocean Commission which was founded in February 2013.

In 2017, the organization provided 1.14 million children with schooling and education; helped resettle 10,665 refugees and special immigrant visa holders in the US; and filed 663 affidavits of relationship to help reunite families separated at the US border. In April 2018, Miliband told The New York Times that he joined the IRC with the idea that it "should not be a sleeping giant, it should be a roused leader in the global humanitarian sector."

== Expense claims ==
In 2009, The Daily Telegraph's investigation of expense claims by Members of Parliament reported that Miliband had claimed for gardening expenses and approximately £30,000 in repairs, decorations and furnishings for his constituency home in South Shields. A spokesperson said: "At every stage, David Miliband followed the procedures and rules as laid out by the parliamentary authorities".

== Business interests ==
On 21 December 2010, the Office of David Miliband Limited was formed with Miliband and his wife Louise as directors.

According to the Financial Times, "much of Mr Miliband's time has been spent on his lucrative directorships and speaking roles, which he would be expected to give up if he returned to frontline politics…as of January 2013, David Miliband has made just short of £1m on top of his MP's salary since he failed to win the Labour leadership in the summer of 2010."

According to a March 2013 article in HuffPost, Miliband had earned almost £1m since the 2010 election. The article listed sources of income from speaking (where he had earned up to £20,000 per event), advisory and teaching roles, journalism, gifts, hospitality and overseas visits.

Miliband is one of six members of the Global Advisory Board of Macro Advisory Partners, which advises multinational corporations, sovereign wealth funds, investors and governments.

In January 2012, David Miliband joined the Board of Directors of Mauritius-based private equity group, Indus Basin Holdings. IBH operates Rice Partners in the Punjab region of Pakistan which specialises in managing the end-to-end supply chain for major global users of rice.

According to the Financial Times, "Mr Miliband's jobs include advisory roles with VantagePoint Capital Partners, a Californian group; Oxford Analytica, a UK advisory company; and Indus Basin Holdings, a Pakistani agrochemical group. He is also a member of the advisory board to the Sir Bani Yas academic forum, which is hosted by the Ministry of Foreign Affairs of the United Arab Emirates. Despite supporting Arsenal, Mr Miliband was vice-chairman and a non-executive director of Sunderland from 2011 until 2013. As a speaker he commands a fee of up to £20,000."

Miliband is also on the Advisory Board of VantagePoint Capital Partners.

Miliband is a member of the Trilateral Commission, founded and chaired by David Rockefeller.

In April 2023, Miliband was appointed non-executive director of Verian, an independent research and communications agency.

== Personal life ==
Miliband married Louise Shackelton, a professional violinist formerly with the London Symphony Orchestra, in 1998. Shackelton and Miliband have adopted two newborn sons called Isaac and Jacob from the United States, the first in December 2004 and the second in October 2007, and currently live in New York City's Upper West Side. In an interview with CNN in 2009, Miliband stated that he grew up in a secular setting and describes himself as an atheist with a "huge respect" for people of faith.

Miliband was portrayed by Henry Lloyd-Hughes in the docu-drama Miliband of Brothers, with Ed Miliband being portrayed by Lloyd Hughes' brother Ben Lloyd-Hughes.

== Awards and honours ==
- 1988: Kennedy Scholarship
- 2016: Honorary Doctorate, The New School.

== Bibliography ==
- Gutch, Richard; Miliband, David; Percival, Richard (1989). Publish and still not be damned: a guide for voluntary groups on the provisions of the 1986 and 1988 Local Government Acts regarding political publicity and the promotion of homosexuality. National Council for Voluntary Organisations. ISBN 978-0-7199-1251-1.
- Tindale, Stephen; Miliband, David (1991). Beyond economics : European government after Maastricht. Discussion paper, no. 12. Fabian Society. ISBN 978-0-7163-3012-7.
- Miliband, David (1992). A more perfect union? Britain and the new Europe. IPPR. ISBN 978-1-872452-53-1.
- Miliband, David (1994). Reinventing the Left. Polity Press. ISBN 978-0-7456-1390-1.
- Miliband, David (2006). Empowerment and the deal for devolution. ODPM. ISBN 978-1-85112-842-6.
- Miliband, David (2017). Rescue: Refugees and the Political Crisis of Our Time. TED Books. ISBN 978-1-50115-439-3.

Parliament of the United Kingdom
| Preceded by David Clark | Member of Parliament for South Shields; 2001–2013 | Succeeded by Emma Lewell-Buck |
Political offices
| Preceded by Stephen Timms | Minister of State for Schools; 2002–2004 | Succeeded by Stephen Twigg |
| Preceded by Ruth Kelly | Minister for the Cabinet Office; 2004–2005 | Succeeded by Liam Byrne |
| Preceded by Ruth Kelly | Chancellor of the Duchy of Lancaster; 2004–2005 | Succeeded by Liam Byrne |
| New office | Minister of Communities and Local Government; 2005–2006 | Succeeded by Ruth Kelly as Secretary of State for Communities and Local Government |
| Preceded by Margaret Beckett | Secretary of State for Environment, Food and Rural Affairs; 2006–2007 | Succeeded by Hilary Benn |
| Preceded by Margaret Beckett | Foreign Secretary; 2007–2010 | Succeeded by William Hague |
| Preceded by William Hague | Shadow Foreign Secretary; 2010 | Succeeded by Yvette Cooper |
Diplomatic posts
| Preceded by George Erik Rupp | President of the International Rescue Committee; 2013–present | Incumbent |
Academic offices
| Preceded by Jean-Claude Juncker | Invocation Speaker of the College of Europe; 2007 | Succeeded by Yves Leterme |
