= William Robson, Baron Robson =

British politician

William Robson c1895

William Robson c1905

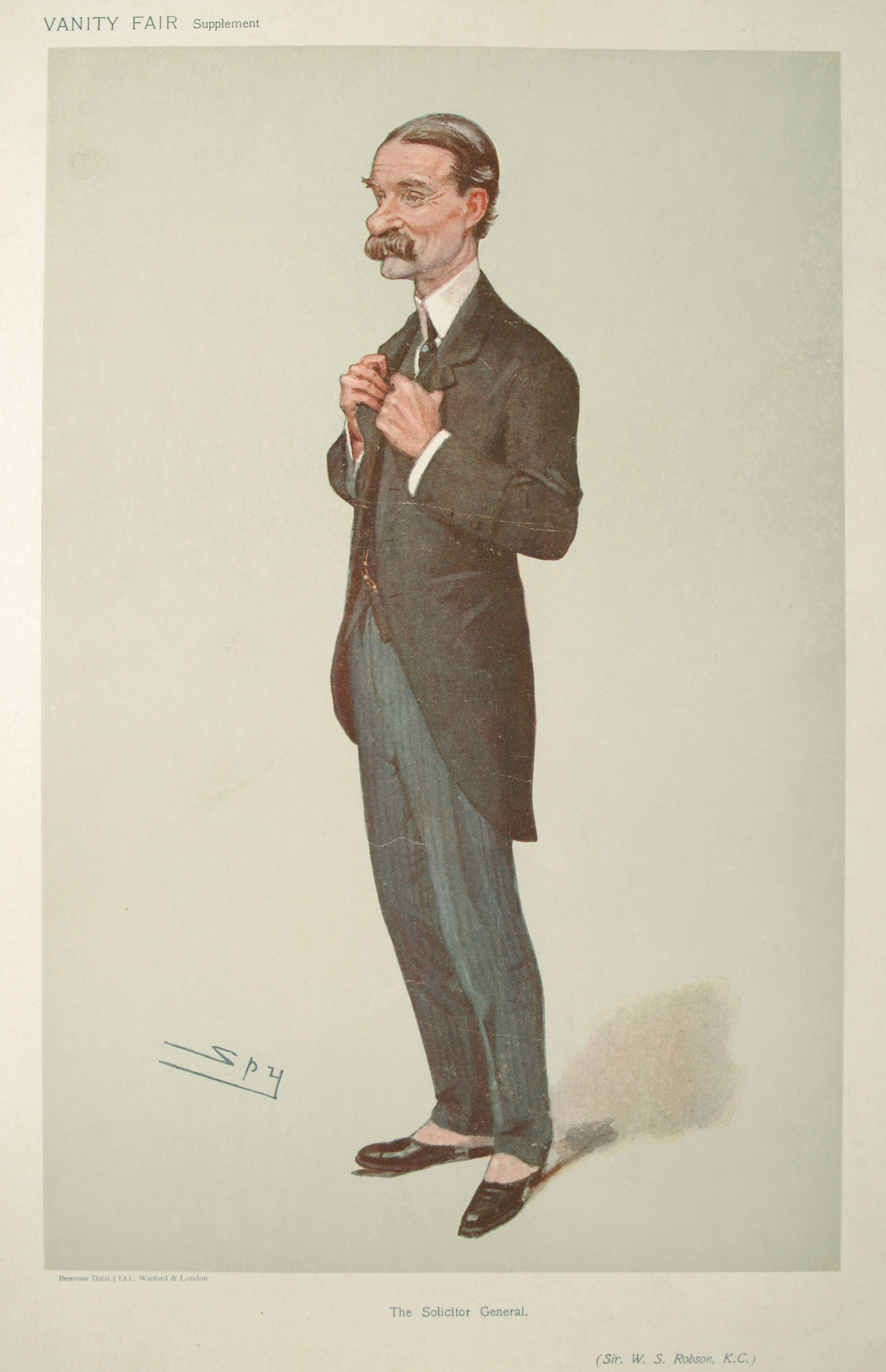
"The Solicitor General" Robson as caricatured by Spy (Leslie Ward) in Vanity Fair, January 1906

William Snowdon Robson, Baron Robson, GCMG, PC (10 September 1852 – 11 September 1918) was an English lawyer, judge and Liberal politician who sat in the House of Commons twice between 1885 and 1910.

== Background and early life ==
Robson was born in Newcastle-upon-Tyne, the son of Robert Robson merchant of Newcastle-on-Tyne and his wife Emily Jane Snowden, daughter of William Snowden of Newcastle-on-Tyne. He was educated at Newcastle and at Gonville and Caius College, Cambridge. He was called to the bar by the Inner Temple in 1880 and became a Queen's Counsel in 1892.

== Political career ==
At the 1885 general election Robson was elected Member of Parliament for Bow and Bromley and held the seat until 1886. At the 1895 general election he was elected MP for South Shields and held the seat until 1910.

=== Government ===
He was the Solicitor General from 1905 to 1908. Upon his appointment, he was knighted the same year. In 1908, he was promoted to be the Attorney General from 1908 to 1910. On 19 July 1910, he was sworn of the Privy Council.

=== Peerage ===
On 12 October 1910, Robson was made a Lord of Appeal in Ordinary and a life peer with the title Baron Robson, of Jesmond in the County of Northumberland. He was appointed to the Order of St Michael and St George as a Knight Grand Cross (GCMG) in the 1911 New Year Honours for "services in connection with the North Atlantic Coast Fisheries Arbitration". He resigned as Lord of Appeal two years later.

== Family ==
Robson married Catharine Burge, daughter of Charles Burge, of Portland Place, London on 26 May 1887. They had a family. His daughter, Hon. Alice Violet Robson (1892–1972), married Sir Charles Travis Clay, a librarian and antiquarian who was the librarian of the House of Lords Library from 1922 to 1956.

Robson died, aged 66, at Telham Court, Battle, Sussex.

== Arms ==
Coat of arms of William Robson, Baron Robson
Notes Blazon not available. Tinctures unknown. Motto Fac Et Spera

Parliament of the United Kingdom
New constituency	Member of Parliament for Bow and Bromley; 1885–1886	Succeeded by Sir John Colomb
Preceded by James Cochran Stevenson	Member of Parliament for South Shields; 1895–1910	Succeeded by Russell Rea
Legal offices
Preceded by Sir Edward Carson	Solicitor General for England and Wales; 1905–1908	Succeeded by Sir Samuel Evans
Preceded by Sir John Lawson Walton	Attorney General for England and Wales; 1908–1910	Succeeded by Sir Rufus Isaacs
