= John Wawn =

British politician

John Wawn MP

Member of Parliament for South Shields
- In office 30 June 1841 – 7 July 1852
- Preceded by: Robert Ingham
- Succeeded by: Robert Ingham

Personal details
- Born: 1801
- Died: 21 September 1859 (aged 58)
- Party: Liberal
- Other political affiliations: Radical

John Twizell Wawn MP (1801 – 21 September 1859) was a British Liberal and Radical politician.

Wawn was first elected Radical MP for South Shields in 1841 and held the seat until he stood down at the 1852 general election. Although he attempted to regain the seat at the 1859 general election as a Liberal, he was unsuccessful.

Parliament of the United Kingdom
Preceded by Robert Ingham	Member of Parliament for South Shields; 1841–1852	Succeeded by Robert Ingham
