= Russell Rea =

English politician

Russell Rea MP, circa 1906

Russell Rea PC, MP (11 December 1846 – 5 February 1916) was an English ship-owner from Liverpool and Liberal Party politician. He sat in the House of Commons in two periods between 1900 and 1916.

== Early life and family ==
Rea was the third son of Daniel Key Rea from Eskdale in Cumberland and his wife Elizabeth, who was the daughter of Liverpool shipbuilder Joseph Russell. He was educated privately.

In 1872 he married Jane Philip Mactaggart, the daughter of Peter Mactaggart from Liverpool. They had two sons and a daughter, Ada Hope Russell Rea (1870-1922). The older son, Walter (1873–1948), entered politics and became a Member of Parliament (MP) for most of the period from 1906 to 1935, and was ennobled in 1937 with the hereditary title of Baron Rea. The younger son ran the Liverpool branch of the family business.

== Career ==
=== Business ===
In the 1890s, he founded the ship-owning and merchant company of R. and J. H. Rea in Liverpool. The business grew to have branches in Cardiff, Southampton, Bristol, and Newcastle upon Tyne, and Rea was senior director of all main company and all its subsidiaries. He was also deputy chairman of the Taff Vale Railway.

=== Politics ===
Rea was the Liberal candidate at the November 1897 by-election in the Exchange division of Liverpool, where he lost by only 54 votes (1% of the total) to the Liberal Unionist candidate Charles McArthur.

At the 1900 general election, he was elected as the Member of Parliament (MP) for Gloucester, where he was re-elected in 1906. He became a Privy Councillor in 1909. However, at the January 1910 election, he lost his seat to the Conservative Party candidate Henry Terrell.

However, he returned to Parliament only 9 months after his defeat, when he won the October 1910 by-election for South Shields.

Rea was appointed as a Junior Lord of the Treasury in 1915, but his health broke down in November 1915, and on 5 February 1916 he died of heart failure at his home in Dorking, aged 69. His funeral was held in St Margaret's, Westminster, and he was buried in Golders Green.

Parliament of the United Kingdom
Preceded by Charles Monk	Member of Parliament for Gloucester; 1900–January 1910	Succeeded by Henry Terrell
Preceded by William Robson	Member of Parliament for South Shields; 1910–1916	Succeeded by Cecil Cochrane
