= Emma Lewell =

British politician (born 1978)

Emma Lewell MP
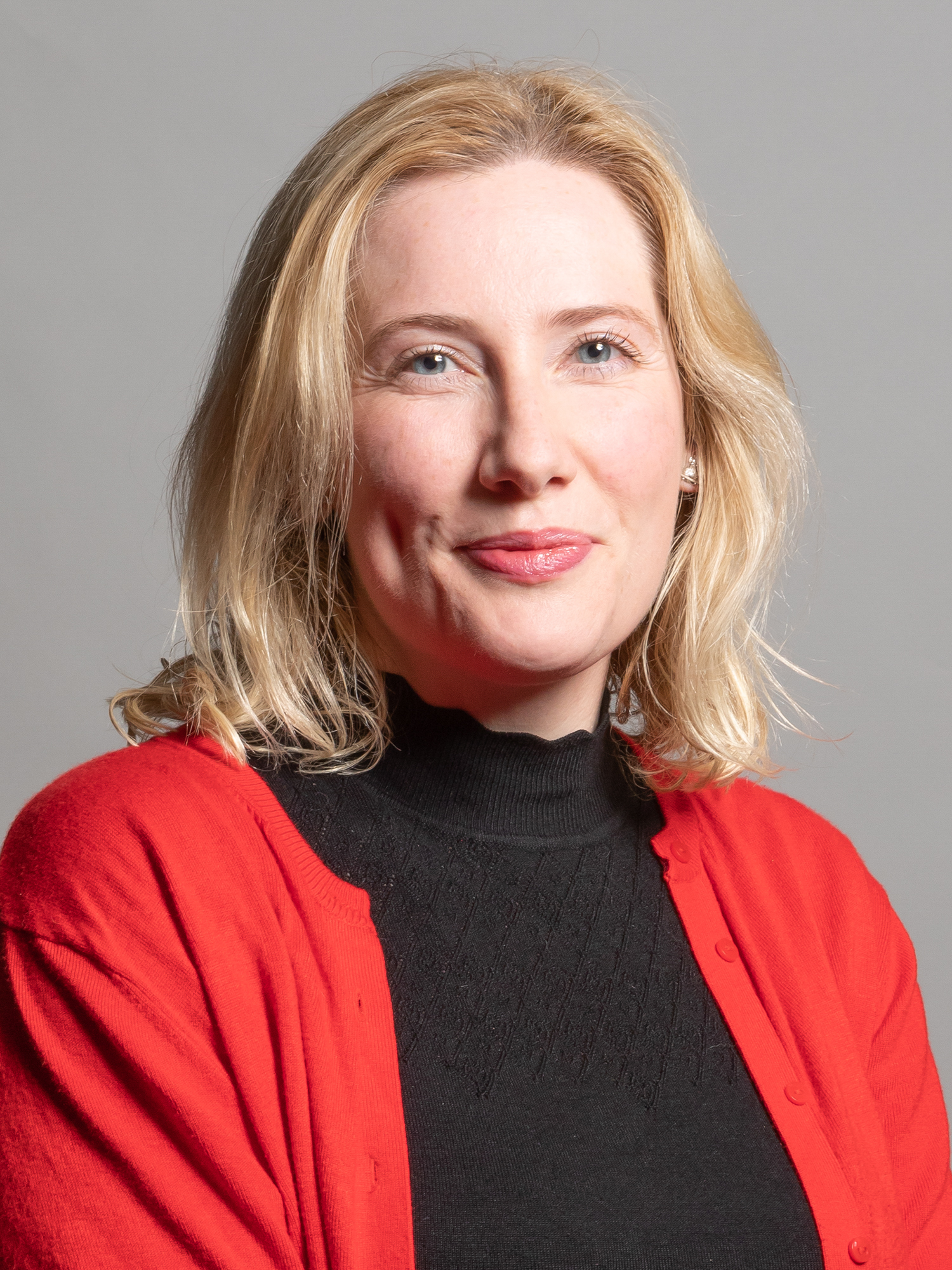
- Official portrait, 2020

Member of Parliament for South Shields
- Incumbent
- Assumed office 2 May 2013
- Preceded by: David Miliband
- Majority: 6,653 (18.1%)
Shadow portfolios
2016–2019	Children and Families
2016	Devolution and Local Government

Member of South Tyneside Council for Primrose
- In office 10 June 2004 – May 2013
- Succeeded by: Moira Smith

Personal details
- Born: Emma Louise Lewell; 8 November 1978 (age 47) South Shields, England
- Party: Labour
- Spouse: Simon Buck (m. 2012; sep. 2021)
- Education: Northumbria University (BA); Durham University (MSW)
- Website: lewellemp.com

Emma Louise Lewell (previously Lewell-Buck; born 8 November 1978) is a Labour Party politician who has been the Member of Parliament (MP) for South Shields since 2013.

== Early life and career ==
Emma Lewell was born on 8 November 1978 in South Shields, from a family of shipyard workers. She is a descendant of William Wouldhave, the inventor of the lifeboat.

Lewell attended St Joseph's Catholic Academy in Hebburn. She studied politics and media studies at Northumbria University, before gaining a master's degree in social work from Durham University.

As a social worker, she specialised in child protection, and later represented the Primrose ward in Jarrow as a South Tyneside councillor from 2004 to 2013.

== Parliamentary career ==
=== 1st term (2013–2015) ===
Lewell was elected to Parliament as MP for South Shields at the 2013 South Shields by-election with 50.4% of the vote and a majority of 6,505.

In June 2013, she became a member of the Environment, Food and Rural Affairs Select Committee replacing Thomas Docherty. In October 2013, she was appointed Parliamentary private secretary to Ivan Lewis, Labour's Shadow Northern Ireland Secretary.

During Lewell's election campaign of 2013, she said helping to bring jobs to the unemployed of South Shields was a priority. In November 2013 she organised a jobs fair in her constituency, which was repeated in November 2014 after she pledged to make it into an annual event.

Lewell joined the All-Party Parliamentary Group on Hunger and Food Poverty chaired by Frank Field and the Bishop of Truro.

In December 2014, she claimed that some people were "having to bury their relatives in their back gardens" as she proposed a Funeral Services Bill intended to require funeral providers to offer a low-cost option.

=== 2nd term (2015–2017) ===
At the 2015 general election, Lewell was re-elected as MP for South Shields with an increased vote share of 51.3% and an increased majority of 10,614.

In July 2015, she was elected as a member of the Work and Pensions Select Committee.

In January 2016, Lewell became shadow minister for devolution and local government in Jeremy Corbyn's frontbench reshuffle. On 29 June 2016, she announced her resignation from the post, commenting that she was "heartbroken at the state of the [Labour] Party". This was a reference to a string of shadow cabinet resignations during the summer leadership crisis. She later supported Owen Smith in the failed attempt to replace Jeremy Corbyn in the 2016 Labour leadership election.

In October 2016, she was re-appointed to Jeremy Corbyn's front bench team as Shadow Education Minister responsible for children and families' policy. She resigned from this position in March 2019 after voting against a second Brexit referendum in defiance of the Labour whip.

=== 3rd term (2017–2019) ===
At the snap 2017 general election, Lewell was again re-elected with an increased vote share of 61.5% and an increased majority of 14,508.

In 2018, Lewell expressed concern about the large number of children in care; there were 75,420 children in care in England in March 2018, a rise of 4% from the year before. She said the rise was due to government cuts to support services like Sure Start, which could help children stay with their families. Lewell said, "The government is missing valuable opportunities to keep children in the care of their families. Not only does that add pressure to budgets already decimated by austerity, it also leaves children and their families with deep and enduring emotional scars".

In October 2019, local party members voted to trigger a reselection contest. She vowed to fight the contest and branded those who voted against her as "bullies and tricksters". 2019 general election. The reselection saw Emma Lewell lose her trigger ballot and was required to go through a full re-selection process in which other candidates would have been considered, but the process could not be completed in time since Prime Minister Johnson called a general election and she was re-imposed by the national party without a local party vote taking place.

=== 4th term (2019–2024) ===
Lewell was again re-elected at the 2019 general election, with a decreased vote share of 45.6% and a decreased majority of 9,585.

Lewell was opposed to COVID-19 vaccine passports and was one of eight Labour MPs who voted against their introduction as part of the government's 'Plan B' restrictions in December 2021.

In November 2022, Emma Lewell became a founder member of the Child of the North APPG; created to address the inequalities facing children across the North of England.

=== 5th term (2024–present) ===
At the 2024 general election, Lewell was again re-elected with a decreased vote share of 41.1% and a decreased majority of 6,653.

Lewell is on the of the Advisory Board of the foreign and defence policy think-tank Council on Geostrategy, and is enrolled on the Global Strategy Programme at the Royal College of Defence Studies, and on the Armed Forces Parliamentary Scheme.

=== Employment of husband ===
Lewell employed her husband, Simon, as a researcher in 2015 despite his being suspended from his job as a carer and having lost his place on a nursing course in response to allegations of swearing at and neglect of vulnerable adults in his care. The allegations were upheld. However, a watchdog investigation found the local authority had made procedural errors and was asked to pay £400 in compensation to Mr Buck. An independent social worker also reviewed the evidence and found that no abuse had taken place. Several members of her Constituency Labour Party wrote to party leader Jeremy Corbyn to request her suspension owing to their concerns over his playing this role. Mr. Buck was subsequently suspended from the Labour Party, pending investigation.

== Personal life ==
Lewell was diagnosed with dyspraxia at the age of 27. She married Simon Buck in 2012. They separated in 2021.

Parliament of the United Kingdom
Preceded by David Miliband	Member of Parliament for South Shields; 2013–present	Incumbent
