= Cecil Cochrane =

Sir Cecil Algernon Cochrane DCL JP MP (24 April 1869 – 23 September 1960) was a British Liberal Party politician. He was elected Member of Parliament for South Shields in 1916, resigning in 1918.

Cochrane was born in Sedgehill, Northumberland, the son of civil engineer William Cochrane and his wife, Eliza Collis. He was educated at Sherborne School and Christ Church, Oxford, graduating MA in 1894. In 1905, he married Frances Sibyl Potter, the youngest daughter of Colonel Addison Potter CB, of Heaton Hall, Newcastle upon Tyne.

In the general election of December 1910 he fought Durham for the Liberals unsuccessfully, and was briefly Member of Parliament for South Shields from 1916 to 1918, having been elected at a by-election in 1916, during the First World War.

He was the chairman of Armstrong College council and the honorary treasurer of the Durham College of Medicine from 1908 to 1926; the two institutions later merged to become Newcastle University. In 1920 he donated a sports ground in Heaton for the use of students at the colleges, which was later named Cochrane Park, and in 1924 he funded the construction of a students' union building.

He was knighted in 1933.

He died in 1960 in Newcastle upon Tyne, aged 92.

An industrial steam locomotive was named after him and is preserved on the Tanfield Railway.

Parliament of the United Kingdom
Preceded by Russell Rea	Member of Parliament for South Shields; 1916 – 1918	Succeeded by Joseph Havelock Wilson
