= Robert Ingham =

British barrister and politician

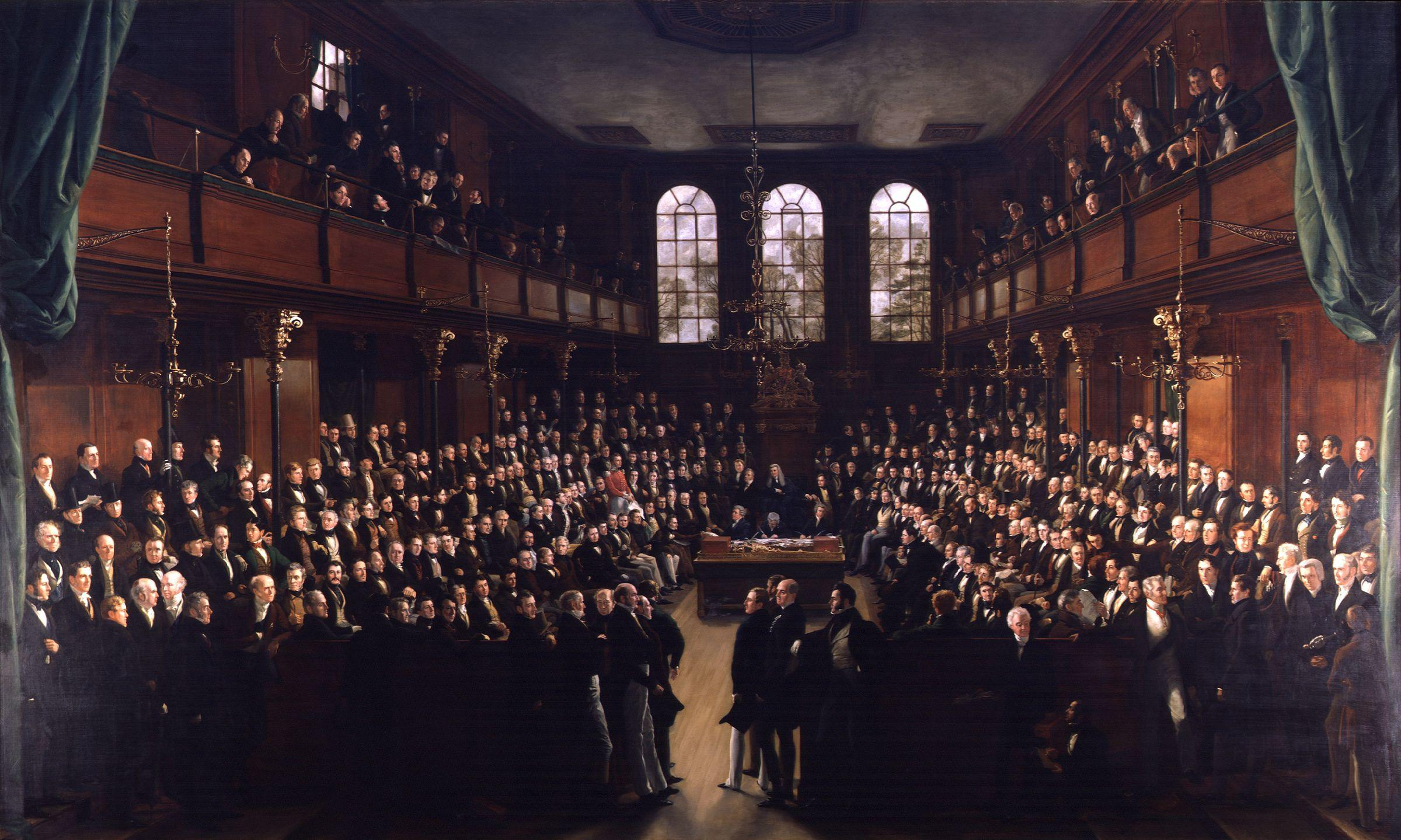

Robert Ingham MP (1793 – 21 October 1875) was a British barrister and politician.

== Early life ==
The fourth son of the surgeon William Ingham and his wife Jane Walker, of Newcastle upon Tyne, Ingham was educated at Harrow School. He matriculated at Oriel College, Oxford in 1811. He graduated with a B.A. in 1815 and an M.A. in 1818, and held a fellowship at Oriel from 1816 until 1826.

== Political career ==
Ingham took to law and was admitted to Lincoln's Inn on 16 June 1820, moving to the Inner Temple in 1825. He returned as a member of parliament (MP) for South Shields in the election of 1832, initially as a Tory. One of his strongest supporters in Shields was local heroine Dolly Peel. He continued to represent South Shields until he was defeated by John Twizell Wawn in the election of 1841. He was also appointed recorder of Berwick-upon-Tweed in June 1832.

In 1846, he was appointed Attorney-General of Durham. In 1850, he became a bencher of the Inner Temple. When Wawn retired in 1852, Ingham beat Henry Liddell in the 1852 election to regain his seat, this time as a Whig. Ingham resigned his attorney-generalship in 1861, and served as reader of the Inner Temple in 1862 and treasurer in 1863. He stood down at the 1868 election, and resigned the recordership of Berwick in 1870. He died in Westoe five years later.

Legal offices
Preceded by David Francis Atcherley	Attorney-General of Durham; 1846–1861	Succeeded by William Mathewson Hindmarch
Parliament of the United Kingdom
New constituency	Member of Parliament for South Shields; 1832–1841	Succeeded by John Twizell Wawn
Preceded by John Twizell Wawn	Member of Parliament for South Shields; 1852–1868	Succeeded by James Cochran Stevenson
