= Henry Terrell (politician) =

Henry Terrell (1856-9 September 1944) was the Conservative Party member of Parliament for Gloucester from 15 January 1910 to 14 December 1918. He replaced Russell Rea of the Liberal Party and was succeeded by James Bruton.

General election December 1910: Gloucester
Party	Candidate	Votes	%	±%
Conservative	Henry Terrell	3,903	50.0	−0.8
Liberal	H. F. B. Lynch	3,899	50.0	+0.8
Majority		4	0.1	−1.5
Turnout		7,802	92.1	−3.4
Registered electors		8,475		0.0
Conservative hold		Swing	−0.8	

General election January 1910: Gloucester
Party	Candidate	Votes	%	±%
Conservative	Henry Terrell	4,109	50.8	+2.8
Liberal	Russell Rea	3,983	49.2	−2.8
Majority		126	1.6	−2.4
Turnout		8,092	95.5	+1.7
Registered electors		8,475		0.0
Conservative hold		Swing	+2.8	
