= South Shields (constituency) =

Parliamentary constituency in the United Kingdom, 1832 onwards

Coordinates: 54.973°N 1.414°W

- Borough constituency for the House of Commons
- Interactive map of boundaries since 2024
- Location within North East England
- County: Tyne and Wear
- Electorate: 68,366 (2024)
- Major settlements: South Shields, Whitburn, Cleadon

Current constituency
- Created: 1832
- Member of Parliament: Emma Lewell (Labour)
- Seats: One
- Created from: County Durham

South Shields is a borough constituency represented in the House of Commons of the Parliament of the United Kingdom. It elects one Member of Parliament (MP) by the first past the post system of election. It has been represented by Emma Lewell of the Labour Party since 2013.

The seat was created by the Reform Act 1832 as a single-member parliamentary borough.

The current constituency covers the area of South Shields in the South Tyneside district of Tyne and Wear.

== Constituency profile ==
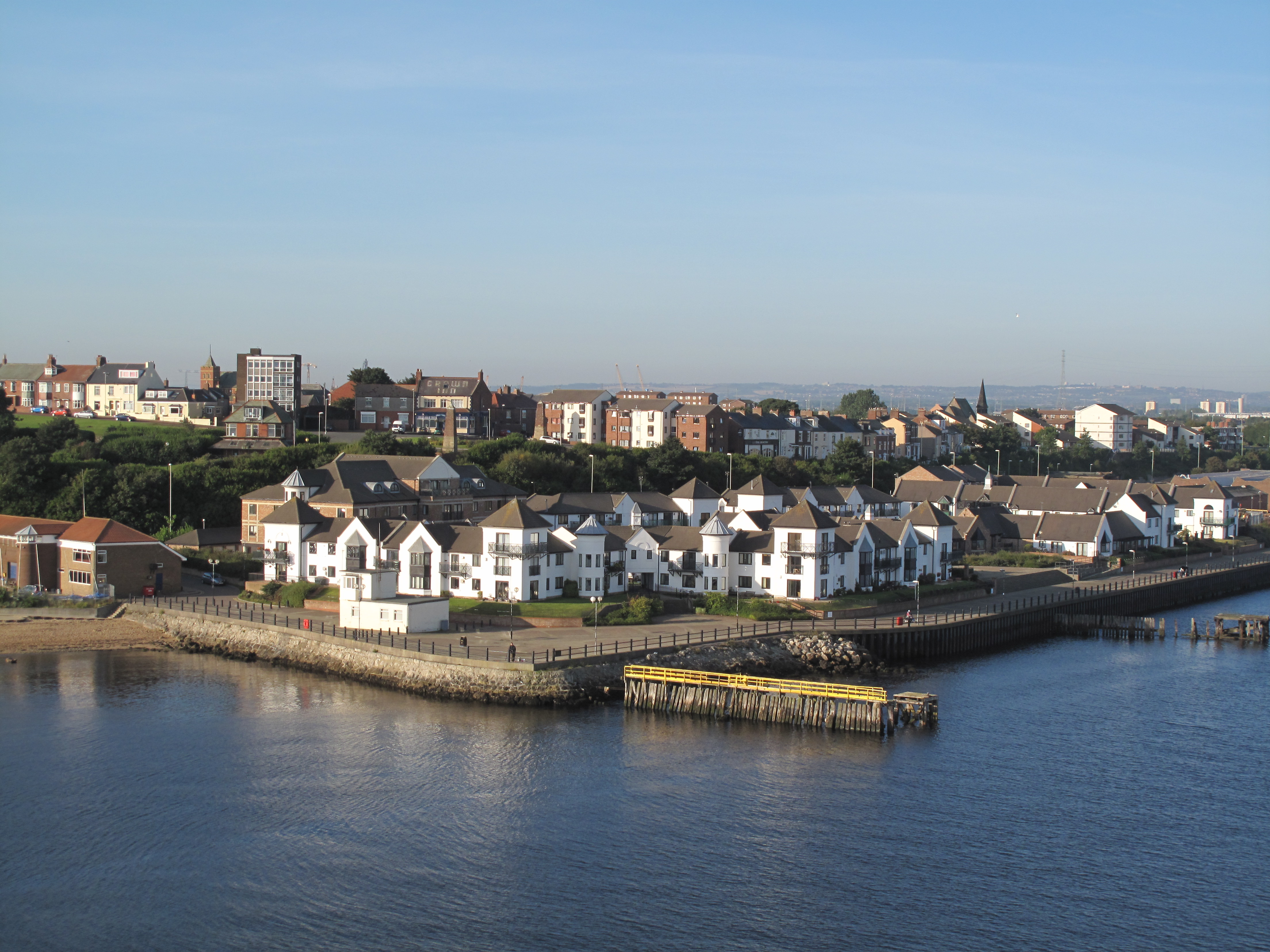
South Shields

South Shields is a constituency in Tyne and Wear in North East England, within the borough of South Tyneside. It covers the large town of South Shields and the outlying villages of East Boldon, Cleadon and Whitburn.

South Shields is a coastal port town that forms part of the Tyneside urban area, located around 7 miles (11 km) east of Newcastle-upon-Tyne and the same distance north of Sunderland. South Shields grew from the shipbuilding and coal mining industries, although these have now disappeared. The town is also a popular tourist destination for its beaches and cliffs. South Shields experienced high unemployment after the deindustrialisation of the late 20th century and the town is still highly-deprived, although the suburban villages of East Boldon and Cleadon are affluent. Residents of South Shields town centre mostly live in dense flats or terraces whilst the suburban areas are largely made up of semi-detached properties. House prices across the constituency are generally similar to the rest of North East England, but the average price is around half the UK average.

South Shields has a below-average proportion of young adults and a large retired population. Residents have low rates of income, average levels of homeownership, and the child poverty rate is high. They have low levels of education and a high proportion work in the health, education and public sectors. The percentage of residents claiming unemployment benefits is high. White people made up 93% of the population at the 2021 census.

Most of the constituency is represented by Reform UK at the local borough council, with some Green Party councillors elected in East Boldon, Cleadon and South Shields town centre. Voters across the constituency strongly supported leaving the European Union in the 2016 referendum; an estimated 61% voted in favour of Brexit compared to the UK-wide figure of 52%.

== Boundaries and boundary changes ==
=== Historic ===
==== 1832–1918 ====
Under the Parliamentary Boundaries Act 1832, the contents of the borough were defined as the Respective Townships of South Shields and Westoe.

See map on Vision of Britain website.

==== 1918–1950 ====
The County Borough of South Shields.

Expanded to be coterminous with County Borough.

==== 1950–1951 ====
As prior but with redrawn boundaries.

Expanded southwards, including the communities of Harton, transferred from Houghton-le-Spring.

==== 1951–1983 ====
As prior but with redrawn boundaries.

==== 1983–1997 ====
The Metropolitan Borough of South Tyneside wards of All Saints, Beacon and Bents, Cleadon Park, Harton, Horsley Hill, Rekendyke, Tyne Dock and Simonside, Westoe, West Park, and Whiteleas.

Minor changes to take account of ward boundaries of the newly formed metropolitan borough, including the transfer of Biddick Hall to Jarrow.

==== 1997–2010 ====
The Metropolitan Borough of South Tyneside wards of All Saints, Beacon and Bents, Biddick Hall, Cleadon Park, Harton, Horsley Hill, Rekendyke, Tyne Dock and Simonside, Westoe, West Park, and Whiteleas.

Biddick Hall gained back from Jarrow.

==== 2010–2024 ====
Map of 2010–2024 boundaries

The Metropolitan Borough of South Tyneside wards of Beacon and Bents, Biddick and All Saints, Cleadon Park, Harton, Horsley Hill, Simonside and Rekendyke, Westoe, West Park, Whitburn and Marsden, and Whiteleas.

Boundary changes for the 2010 general election transferred the community of Whitburn into the South Shields constituency from the neighbouring Jarrow seat.

=== Current ===
Further to the 2023 review of Westminster constituencies, which came into effect for the 2024 United Kingdom general election, the constituency was expanded to bring the electorate within the permitted range, by adding the South Tyneside ward of Cleadon and East Boldon, transferred from the abolished Jarrow constituency.

Taking into account the local government boundary review which changed some ward names, the constituency comprises the following wards of the Metropolitan Borough of South Tyneside from May 2026:

- Beacon & Bents; Biddick & All Saints; Cleadon Park & Harton Moor; Cleadon Village & East Boldon; Harton; Horsley Hill & Westoe Crown; Simonside & Rekendyke; West Park; Westoe; Whitburn & Marsden; and Whiteleas.

== Members of Parliament ==
The seat was held from 2001 to 2013 by David Miliband, who served as Foreign Secretary from 2007 until Labour's general election defeat of 2010. On 26 March 2013 Miliband announced his resignation from Parliament in order to take up a post as the head of the International Rescue Committee in New York City.

William Robson

Election	Member	Party
1832	Robert Ingham	Tory
1834	Robert Ingham	Conservative
1841	John Wawn	Radical
1852	Robert Ingham	Whig
1859	Robert Ingham	Liberal
1868	James Cochran Stevenson	Liberal
1895	William Robson	Liberal
1910 by-election	Russell Rea	Liberal
1916 by-election	Cecil Cochrane	Liberal
1918 by-election	Havelock Wilson	Coalition Liberal
1922	Havelock Wilson	National Liberal
1922	Edward Harney	Liberal
1929	Chuter Ede	Labour
1931	Harcourt Johnstone	Liberal
1935	Chuter Ede	Labour
1964	Arthur Blenkinsop	Labour
1979	David Clark	Labour
2001	David Miliband	Labour
2013 by-election	Emma Lewell	Labour

With two exceptions (Arthur Blenkinsop and Emma Lewell) every South Shields MP since 1929 has been a cabinet member at some point in their career. However, Blenkinsop was a junior minister, and Lewell has been a shadow minister. Two of them have held one of the Great Offices of State while MP for South Shields: Chuter Ede was Home Secretary and Miliband became Foreign Secretary.

The Open Spaces Society in 2013 observed that there has been a tradition of South Shields MPs, from Chuter Ede onwards, promoting the cause of public access and common land.

== Elections ==
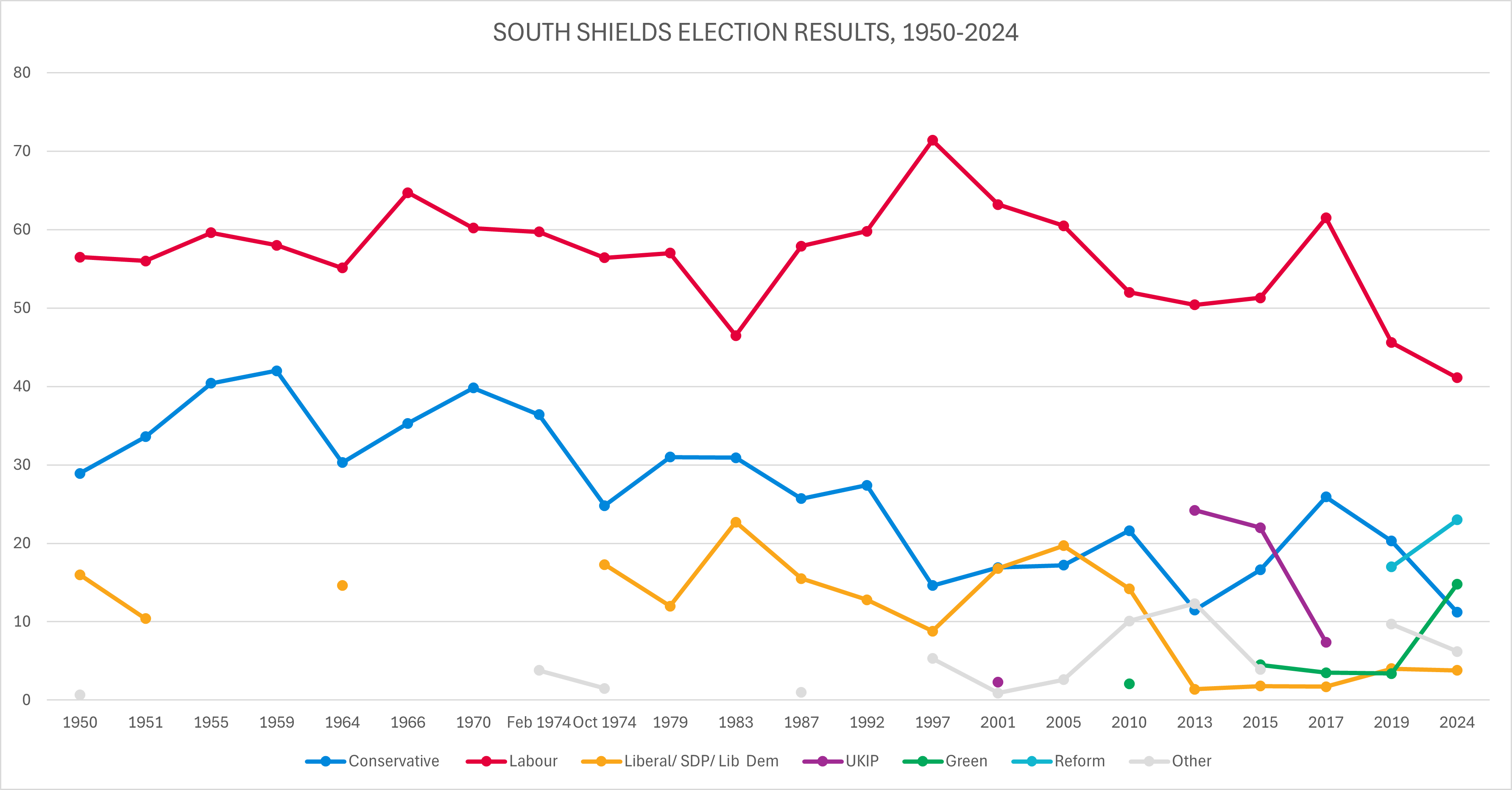
Election results 1950–2024

=== Elections in the 2020s ===
General election 2024: South Shields
Party	Candidate	Votes	%	±%
Labour	Emma Lewell	15,122	41.1	−3.0
Reform	Steve Holt	8,469	23.0	+8.3
Green	David Francis	5,433	14.8	+11.7
Conservative	Craig Robinson	4,128	11.2	−14.6
Independent	Ahmed Khan	2,270	6.2	New
Liberal Democrats	Jonathan Aibi	1,402	3.8	+0.3
Majority		6,653	18.1	−7.2
Turnout		36,824	53.9	−11.8
Registered electors		68,366		
Labour hold		Swing		

=== Elections in the 2010s ===
General election 2019: South Shields
Party	Candidate	Votes	%	±%
Labour	Emma Lewell	17,273	45.6	−15.9
Conservative	Oni Oviri	7,688	20.3	−5.6
Brexit Party	Glenn Thompson	6,446	17.0	New
Independent	Geoff Thompson	3,658	9.7	New
Liberal Democrats	William Shepherd	1,514	4.0	+2.3
Green	Sarah McKeown	1,303	3.4	−0.1
Majority		9,585	25.3	−10.3
Turnout		37,882	60.3	−4.0
Labour hold		Swing	−5.2	

General election 2017: South Shields
Party	Candidate	Votes	%	±%
Labour	Emma Lewell	25,078	61.5	+10.2
Conservative	Felicity Buchan	10,570	25.9	+9.3
UKIP	Richard Elvin	3,006	7.4	−14.6
Green	Shirley Ford	1,437	3.5	−1.0
Liberal Democrats	Gita Gordon	681	1.7	−0.1
Majority		14,508	35.6	+6.3
Turnout		40,772	64.3	+6.5
Labour hold		Swing		

General election 2015: South Shields
Party	Candidate	Votes	%	±%
Labour	Emma Lewell	18,589	51.3	−0.7
UKIP	Norman Dennis	7,975	22.0	New
Conservative	Robert Oliver	6,021	16.6	−5.0
Green	Shirley Ford	1,614	4.5	+2.4
Independent	Lisa Nightingale	1,427	3.9	New
Liberal Democrats	Gitanjali (Gita) Gordon	639	1.8	−12.4
Majority		10,614	29.3	−1.1
Turnout		36,265	57.8	+0.1
Labour hold		Swing		

2013 South Shields by-election
Party	Candidate	Votes	%	±%
Labour	Emma Lewell	12,493	50.4	−1.6
UKIP	Richard Elvin	5,988	24.2	New
Conservative	Karen Allen	2,857	11.5	−10.1
Independent	Ahmed Khan	1,331	5.4	New
Independent Socialist Party	Phil Brown	750	3.0	New
BNP	Dorothy Brookes	711	2.9	−3.6
Liberal Democrats	Hugh Annand	352	1.4	−12.8
Monster Raving Loony	Howling Laud Hope	197	0.8	New
Independent	Thomas Darwood	57	0.2	New
Majority		6,505	26.2	−4.2
Turnout		24,780	39.3	−18.4
Labour hold		Swing		

General election 2010: South Shields
Party	Candidate	Votes	%	±%
Labour	David Miliband	18,995	52.0	−8.5
Conservative	Karen Allen	7,886	21.6	+4.4
Liberal Democrats	Stephen Psallidas	5,189	14.2	−5.5
BNP	Donna Watson	2,382	6.5	New
Green	Shirley Ford	762	2.1	New
Independent	Siamak Kaikavoosi	729	2.0	New
Independent	Victor Thomson	316	0.9	New
Independent	Sam Navabi	168	0.5	New
Fight for an Anti-War Government	Roger Nettleship	91	0.2	New
Majority		11,109	30.4	−10.4
Turnout		36,518	57.7	+6.8
Labour hold		Swing		

=== Elections in the 2000s ===
General election 2005: South Shields
Party	Candidate	Votes	%	±%
Labour	David Miliband	18,269	60.5	−2.7
Liberal Democrats	Stephen Psallidas	5,957	19.7	+2.9
Conservative	Richard Lewis	5,207	17.2	+0.3
Independent	Nader Afshari-Naderi	773	2.6	New
Majority		12,312	40.8	−5.5
Turnout		30,206	50.9	+1.2
Labour hold		Swing		

General election 2001: South Shields
Party	Candidate	Votes	%	±%
Labour	David Miliband	19,230	63.2	−8.2
Conservative	Joanna Gardner	5,140	16.9	+2.3
Liberal Democrats	Marshall Grainger	5,127	16.8	+8.0
UKIP	Alan Hardy	689	2.3	New
Independent	Roger Nettleship	262	0.9	New
Majority		14,090	46.3	−10.5
Turnout		30,448	49.7	−12.8
Labour hold		Swing	−5.3	

=== Elections in the 1990s ===
General election 1997: South Shields
Party	Candidate	Votes	%	±%
Labour	David Clark	27,834	71.4	+11.6
Conservative	Mark Hoban	5,681	14.6	−12.8
Liberal Democrats	David Ord	3,429	8.8	−4.0
Referendum	Alan Lorriane	1,660	4.3	New
Independent	Ian Wilburn	374	1.0	New
Majority		22,153	56.8	+24.4
Turnout		38,978	62.5	−7.6
Labour hold		Swing	+12.2	

General election 1992: South Shields
Party	Candidate	Votes	%	±%
Labour	David Clark	24,876	59.8	+1.9
Conservative	Jonathan L Howard	11,399	27.4	+1.7
Liberal Democrats	Arthur Preece	5,344	12.8	−2.7
Majority		13,477	32.4	+0.2
Turnout		41,619	70.1	−0.6
Labour hold		Swing	+0.1	

=== Elections in the 1980s ===
General election 1987: South Shields
Party	Candidate	Votes	%	±%
Labour	David Clark	24,882	57.9	+11.4
Conservative	Michael Fabricant	11,031	25.7	−5.2
SDP	Margaret Melling	6,654	15.5	−7.2
Democrat	Edward Dunn	408	1.0	New
Majority		13,851	32.2	+16.6
Turnout		42,975	70.7	+4.5
Labour hold		Swing	+8.2	

General election 1983: South Shields
Party	Candidate	Votes	%	±%
Labour	David Clark	19,055	46.5	−10.5
Conservative	Peter Groves	12,653	30.9	−0.1
SDP	Peter Angus	9,288	22.7	+10.7
Majority		6,402	15.6	−10.4
Turnout		40,996	66.2	−5.0
Labour hold		Swing	−5.2	

=== Elections in the 1970s ===
General election 1979: South Shields
Party	Candidate	Votes	%	±%
Labour	David Clark	28,675	57.0	+0.6
Conservative	R Booth	15,551	31.0	+6.2
Liberal	L Monger	6,003	12.0	−5.3
Majority		13,124	26.0	−5.6
Turnout		50,229	71.2	+6.5
Labour hold		Swing	−2.8	

General election October 1974: South Shields
Party	Candidate	Votes	%	±%
Labour	Arthur Blenkinsop	26,492	56.4	−3.3
Conservative	NS Smith	11,667	24.8	−11.6
Liberal	L Garbutt	8,106	17.3	New
National Front	W Owen	711	1.5	−2.3
Majority		14,825	31.6	+8.3
Turnout		46,976	64.7	−6.9
Labour hold		Swing	+4.1	

General election February 1974: South Shields
Party	Candidate	Votes	%	±%
Labour	Arthur Blenkinsop	30,740	59.7	−0.5
Conservative	S Smith	18,754	36.4	−3.4
National Front	W Owen	1,958	3.8	New
Majority		11,986	23.3	+2.9
Turnout		51,452	71.6	+4.8
Labour hold		Swing	+1.9	

General election 1970: South Shields
Party	Candidate	Votes	%	±%
Labour	Arthur Blenkinsop	30,191	60.2	−4.5
Conservative	John McKee	19,960	39.8	+4.5
Majority		10,231	20.4	−9.0
Turnout		50,151	66.8	−1.9
Labour hold		Swing	−4.5	

=== Elections in the 1960s ===
General election 1966: South Shields
Party	Candidate	Votes	%	±%
Labour	Arthur Blenkinsop	31,829	64.7	+9.6
Conservative	Charles MacKenzie Dallas	17,340	35.3	+5.0
Majority		14,489	29.4	+4.6
Turnout		49,169	68.7	−5.4
Labour hold		Swing	+2.35	

General election 1964: South Shields
Party	Candidate	Votes	%	±%
Labour	Arthur Blenkinsop	29,694	55.1	−2.9
Conservative	John Chalmers	16,344	30.3	−11.7
Liberal	Thomas Henry Campbell Wardlaw	7,837	14.6	New
Majority		13,350	24.8	+8.8
Turnout		53,875	74.1	−0.3
Labour hold		Swing	+4.45	

=== Elections in the 1950s ===
General election 1959: South Shields
Party	Candidate	Votes	%	±%
Labour	Chuter Ede	32,577	58.0	−1.6
Conservative	John Chalmers	23,638	42.0	+1.6
Majority		8,939	16.0	−3.2
Turnout		56,215	74.4	0.0
Labour hold		Swing	−1.7	

General election 1955: South Shields
Party	Candidate	Votes	%	±%
Labour	Chuter Ede	31,734	59.6	+3.6
Conservative	John Chalmers	21,482	40.4	+6.8
Majority		10,252	19.2	−3.2
Turnout		53,216	74.4	−6.1
Labour hold		Swing	−1.6	

General election 1951: South Shields
Party	Candidate	Votes	%	±%
Labour	Chuter Ede	33,633	56.0	−0.5
Conservative	John Chalmers	20,208	33.6	+6.7
Liberal	Charles Jonathan Kitchell	6,270	10.4	−5.6
Majority		13,425	22.4	−7.2
Turnout		60,111	80.5	−1.2
Labour hold		Swing	−3.7	

General election 1950: South Shields
Party	Candidate	Votes	%	±%
Labour	Chuter Ede	33,452	56.5	−2.9
Conservative	John Chalmers	15,897	28.9	−11.7
Liberal	John George	9,446	16.0	New
Communist	FO Smith	415	0.7	New
Majority		17,555	29.6	+10.8
Turnout		59,210	81.7	+8.6
Labour hold		Swing	+5.4	

=== Elections in the 1940s ===
General election 1945: South Shields
Party	Candidate	Votes	%	±%
Labour	Chuter Ede	22,410	59.4	+11.2
National Liberal	Donald Maurice Parry	15,296	40.6	New
Majority		7,114	18.8	−1.1
Turnout		37,706	73.1	+0.3
Labour hold		Swing	+12.6	

=== Elections in the 1930s ===
General election 1935: South Shields
Party	Candidate	Votes	%	±%
Labour	Chuter Ede	22,031	48.16	+7.97
Liberal	Harcourt Johnstone	12,932	29.27	−30.54
National Labour	Frederick Burden	10,784	23.57	New
Majority		9,099	19.89	N/A
Turnout		45,747	72.79	−7.34
Labour gain from Liberal		Swing		

General election 1931: South Shields
Party	Candidate	Votes	%	±%
Liberal	Harcourt Johnstone	30,528	59.81	+16.81
Labour	Chuter Ede	20,512	40.19	−2.01
Majority		10,016	19.62	N/A
Turnout		51,040	80.13	+7.23
Liberal gain from Labour		Swing		

=== Elections in the 1920s ===
General election 1929: South Shields
Party	Candidate	Votes	%	±%
Labour	Chuter Ede	18,938	42.2	+0.1
Liberal	Harold Burge Robson	18,898	42.0	−15.9
Unionist	William Nunn	7,110	15.8	New
Majority		40	0.2	N/A
Turnout		44,946	72.9	−2.4
Labour gain from Liberal		Swing	+8.0	

General election 1924: South Shields
Party	Candidate	Votes	%	±%
Liberal	Edward Harney	23,171	57.9	−1.4
Labour	William Lawther	16,852	42.1	+1.4
Majority		6,319	15.8	−2.8
Turnout		40,023	75.3	+1.8
Liberal hold		Swing	−1.4	

General election 1923: South Shields
Party	Candidate	Votes	%	±%
Liberal	Edward Harney	22,912	59.3	+19.5
Labour	William Lawther	15,717	40.7	+1.0
Majority		7,195	18.6	+18.5
Turnout		28,629	73.5	−2.7
Liberal hold		Swing	+9.5	

General election 1922: South Shields
Party	Candidate	Votes	%	±%
Liberal	Edward Harney	15,760	39.8	N/A
Labour	William Lawther	15,735	39.7	+14.9
National Liberal	Havelock Wilson	8,121	20.5	−54.7
Majority		25	0.1	−50.3
Turnout		39,616	76.2	+24.9
Liberal gain from National Liberal		Swing		

=== Elections in the 1910s ===
Havelock Wilson

General election 1918: South Shields
Party		Candidate	Votes	%
C	National Liberal	Havelock Wilson	19,514	75.2
	Labour	George John Rowe	6,425	24.8
Majority			13,089	50.4
Turnout			25,939	
	National Liberal hold			
C indicates candidate endorsed by the coalition government.

1918 South Shields by-election
Party	Candidate	Votes	%	±%
National Liberal	Havelock Wilson	Unopposed		
National Liberal gain from Liberal				

1916 South Shields by-election
Party	Candidate	Votes	%	±%
Liberal	Cecil Cochrane	Unopposed		
Liberal hold				

Russell Rea

General election December 1910: South Shields
Party	Candidate	Votes	%	±%
Liberal	Russell Rea	Unopposed		
Liberal hold				

1910 South Shields by-election
Party	Candidate	Votes	%	±%
Liberal	Russell Rea	7,929	61.8	−3.4
Liberal Unionist	Roland Edmund Lomax Vaughan Williams	4,910	38.2	+3.4
Majority		3,019	23.6	−6.8
Turnout		12,839	70.1	−6.0
Registered electors		18,320		
Liberal hold		Swing	−3.4	

General election January 1910: South Shields
Party	Candidate	Votes	%	±%
Liberal	William Robson	9,090	65.2	−8.7
Liberal Unionist	Roland Edmund Lomax Vaughan Williams	4,854	34.8	+8.7
Majority		4,236	30.4	−17.4
Turnout		13,944	76.1	+3.5
Registered electors		18,320		
Liberal hold		Swing	−8.7	

=== Elections in the 1900s ===
William Robson

General election 1906: South Shields
Party	Candidate	Votes	%	±%
Liberal	William Robson	9,717	73.9	+9.6
Conservative	A R Chamberlayne	3,431	26.1	−9.6
Majority		6,286	47.8	+19.2
Turnout		13,148	72.6	+0.6
Registered electors		18,106		
Liberal hold		Swing	+9.6	

General election 1900: South Shields
Party	Candidate	Votes	%	±%
Liberal	William Robson	7,417	64.3	+13.6
Conservative	R Readhead	4,119	35.7	−13.6
Majority		3,298	28.6	+27.2
Turnout		11,536	72.0	+2.2
Registered electors		16,033		
Liberal hold		Swing	+13.6	

=== Elections in the 1890s ===
General election 1895: South Shields
Party	Candidate	Votes	%	±%
Liberal	William Robson	5,057	50.7	−4.9
Conservative	Henry Herbert Wainwright	4,924	49.3	+4.9
Majority		133	1.4	−9.8
Turnout		9,981	69.8	+2.5
Registered electors		14,307		
Liberal hold		Swing	−4.9	

General election 1892: South Shields
Party	Candidate	Votes	%	±%
Liberal	James Cochran Stevenson	4,965	55.6	N/A
Conservative	Henry Herbert Wainwright	3,958	44.4	N/A
Majority		1,007	11.2	N/A
Turnout		8,923	67.3	N/A
Registered electors		13,259		
Liberal hold				

=== Elections in the 1880s ===
General election 1886: South Shields
Party	Candidate	Votes	%	±%
Liberal	James Cochran Stevenson	Unopposed		
Liberal hold				

General election 1885: South Shields
Party	Candidate	Votes	%	±%
Liberal	James Cochran Stevenson	4,064	56.5	−18.4
Conservative	William Digby Seymour	3,128	43.5	+18.4
Majority		936	13.0	−36.8
Turnout		7,192	60.3	+0.4
Registered electors		11,928		
Liberal hold		Swing	−18.4	

General election 1880: South Shields
Party	Candidate	Votes	%	±%
Liberal	James Cochran Stevenson	4,435	74.9	N/A
Conservative	Henry Best Hans-Hamilton	1,486	25.1	N/A
Majority		2,949	49.8	N/A
Turnout		5,921	59.9	N/A
Registered electors		9,893		
Liberal hold				

=== Elections in the 1870s ===
General election 1874: South Shields
Party	Candidate	Votes	%	±%
Liberal	James Cochran Stevenson	Unopposed		
Registered electors		8,870		
Liberal hold				

=== Elections in the 1860s ===
General election 1868: South Shields
Party	Candidate	Votes	%	±%
Liberal	James Cochran Stevenson	2,582	53.1	N/A
Liberal	Charles Palmer	2,277	46.9	N/A
Majority		305	6.2	N/A
Turnout		4,859	78.3	N/A
Registered electors		6,208		
Liberal hold				

General election 1865: South Shields
Party	Candidate	Votes	%	±%
Liberal	Robert Ingham	Unopposed		
Registered electors		1,113		
Liberal hold				

=== Elections in the 1850s ===
General election 1859: South Shields
Party	Candidate	Votes	%	±%
Liberal	Robert Ingham	506	62.8	N/A
Liberal	John Wawn	300	37.2	N/A
Majority		206	25.6	N/A
Turnout		806	71.6	N/A
Registered electors		1,126		
Liberal hold				

General election 1857: South Shields
Party	Candidate	Votes	%	±%
Whig	Robert Ingham	Unopposed		
Registered electors		1,079		
Whig hold				

General election 1852: South Shields
Party	Candidate	Votes	%	±%
Whig	Robert Ingham	430	63.3	−2.1
Conservative	Henry Liddell	249	36.7	+2.1
Majority		181	26.6	N/A
Turnout		679	73.4	+5.0
Registered electors		925		
Whig gain from Radical		Swing	−2.1	

=== Elections in the 1840s ===
General election 1847: South Shields
Party	Candidate	Votes	%	±%
Radical	John Wawn	333	65.4	+15.5
Conservative	William Whateley	176	34.6	−15.5
Majority		157	30.8	+23.9
Turnout		509	68.4	−2.8
Registered electors		744		
Radical hold		Swing	+15.5	

General election 1841: South Shields
Party	Candidate	Votes	%	±%
Radical	John Wawn	240	49.9	N/A
Conservative	Robert Ingham	207	43.0	N/A
Conservative	George Fyler	34	7.1	N/A
Majority		33	6.9	N/A
Turnout		481	71.2	N/A
Registered electors		676		
Radical gain from Conservative		Swing	N/A	

=== Elections in the 1830s ===
General election 1837: South Shields
Party	Candidate	Votes	%
Conservative	Robert Ingham	Unopposed	
Registered electors		644	
Conservative hold			

General election 1835: South Shields
Party	Candidate	Votes	%	±%
Conservative	Robert Ingham	273	68.1	+19.2
Whig	Russell Bowlby	128	31.9	+31.4
Majority		145	36.2	+13.1
Turnout		401	77.4	−10.8
Registered electors		518		
Conservative hold		Swing	−6.1	

General election 1832: South Shields
Party	Candidate	Votes	%
Tory	Robert Ingham	205	48.9
Tory	George Palmer	108	25.8
Whig	William Gowan	104	24.8
Whig	Russell Bowlby	2	0.5
Majority		97	23.1
Turnout		419	88.2
Registered electors		475	
Tory win (new seat)			

== See also ==
- Parliamentary constituencies in Tyne and Wear
- History of parliamentary constituencies and boundaries in Tyne and Wear
- History of parliamentary constituencies and boundaries in Durham
- Parliamentary constituencies in North East England
