= Conventional wastewater treatment =

Conventional wastewater treatment refers to various methods of treating different categories of wastewater, and may include any of the following:

- Sewage treatment – treatment and disposal of human waste.
- Industrial wastewater treatment – the treatment of wet wastes from manufacturing industry and commerce including mining, quarrying and heavy industries.
- Agricultural wastewater treatment – treatment and disposal of liquid animal waste, pesticide residues etc. from agriculture.
- Radioactive waste treatment – the treatment and containment of radioactive waste.

== See also ==
- Waste management – re-use, recycling and disposal of solid waste from manufacturing, commerce and domestic sources.
