= Conventionally grown =

Conventionally grown is an agriculture term referring to a method of growing edible plants (such as fruit and vegetables) and other products. It is opposite to organic growing methods which attempt to produce without synthetic chemicals (fertilizers, pesticides, antibiotics, hormones) or genetically modified organisms. Conventionally grown products, meanwhile, often use fertilizers and pesticides which allow for higher yield, out of season growth, greater resistance, greater longevity and a generally greater mass. Conventionally grown fruit: PLU code consists of 4 numbers (e.g. 4012). Organically grown fruit: PLU code consists of 5 numbers and begins with 9 (e.g. 94012) Genetically engineered fruit: PLU code consists of 5 numbers and begins with 8 (e.g. 84012).
