= 1918 South Shields by-election =

UK parliamentary by-election

The 1918 South Shields by-election was a parliamentary by-election held for the British House of Commons constituency of South Shields on 28 October 1918.

== Vacancy ==
The by-election was caused by the resignation of the sitting Liberal Member of Parliament (MP), Cecil Cochrane. Cochrane had held the seat since himself winning it in a by-election on 18 March 1916.

== Candidates ==
The only candidate nominated was the Liberal Havelock Wilson a former trade union official who had previously been MP for Middlesbrough from 1892 – 1900 and from 1906 –January 1910.

The Labour Party had earlier selected Mr George Rowe of the Boilermakers' Society as their candidate but in the end decided not to contest the seat. Part of the reason for this might have been Havelock Wilson's long connection with the trade union movement and his decision to describe himself as Coalition Liberal and Trade Union candidate.

With the exception of the December 1910 general election when Russell Rea was returned unopposed for the Liberals, all recent elections had been contested by the Unionists. That they chose not to do so in the by-election was presumably because Havelock Wilson was nominated as the candidate of the Coalition government of David Lloyd George in which the Conservative Party participated.

== The result ==
Havelock Wilson was returned unopposed.

South Shields by-election, 1918
Party	Candidate	Votes	%	±%
National Liberal	Havelock Wilson	Unopposed	N/A	N/A
National Liberal hold				

== See also ==
- 1916 South Shields by-election
- List of United Kingdom by-elections
- United Kingdom by-election records
