= 1910 South Shields by-election =

UK Parliamentary by-election

Russell Rea

A by-election was held in South Shields on 27 October 1910, after the Liberal incumbent Sir William Robson resigned to become a Lord of Appeal. The by-election was won by the Liberal Candidate, Russell Rea.

== Result ==
1910 South Shields by-election
Party	Candidate	Votes	%	±%
Liberal	Russell Rea	7,929	61.8	−3.4
Liberal Unionist	Roland Vaughan Williams	4,910	38.2	+3.4
Majority		3,019	23.6	−6.8
Turnout		12,839	70.1	−6.0
Registered electors		18,320		
Liberal hold		Swing	−3.4	
