= 1916 South Shields by-election =

UK parliamentary by-election

The 1916 South Shields by-election was a parliamentary by-election held for the UK House of Commons constituency of South Shields on 18 March 1916.

== Vacancy ==
The by-election was caused by the death of the sitting Liberal Member of Parliament (MP) Russell Rea who had held the seat since himself winning it in a by-election on 27 October 1910.

== Candidates ==
The Liberals selected Cecil Cochrane a 46-year-old ironmaster from Middlesbrough as their candidate. Cochrane had contested Durham for the Liberals at the December 1910 general election. In view of the wartime truce between the parties, neither the Unionists nor the Labour Party put forward candidates and there were no Independent candidates either.

== Result ==
Cochrane was returned unopposed.

South Shields by-election, 1916:
Party	Candidate	Votes	%	±%
Liberal	Cecil Cochrane	Unopposed	N/A	N/A
Liberal hold				

== See also ==
- List of United Kingdom by-elections
- United Kingdom by-election records
- 1918 South Shields by-election
