= List of parks in Toronto =

The following is a list of notable parks in the city of Toronto, Ontario, Canada. The appearance of Toronto's ravines was altered by floods caused by Hurricane Hazel in October 1954 shortly after the establishment of Metropolitan Toronto and many of Toronto's parks were established in the resulting floodplain.

== Municipal parks ==
The following notable parks are maintained by Toronto Parks and Recreation Division:

=== A ===
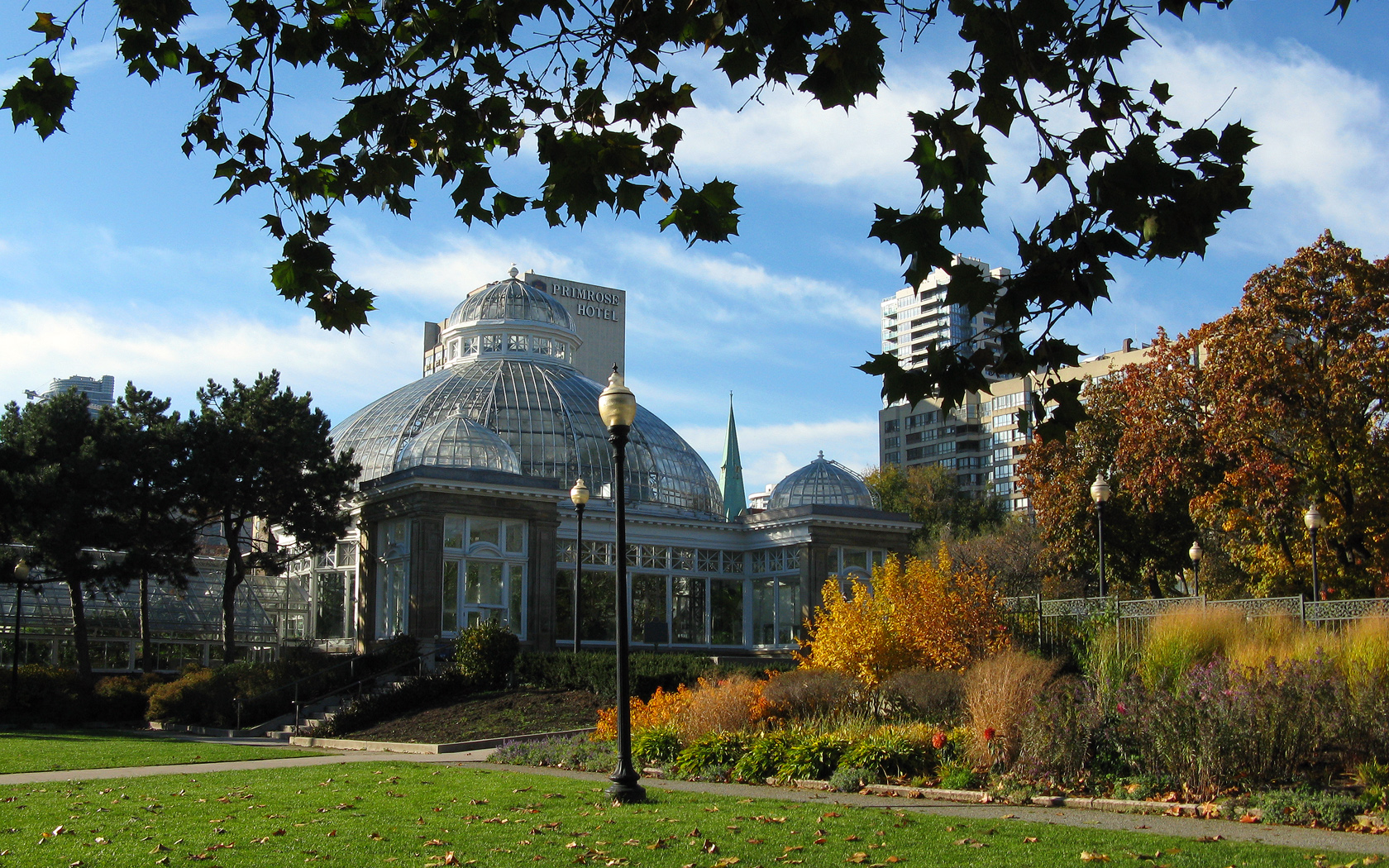
The conservatory at Allan Gardens. Established in 1858, the gardens is one of the city's oldest extant parks.

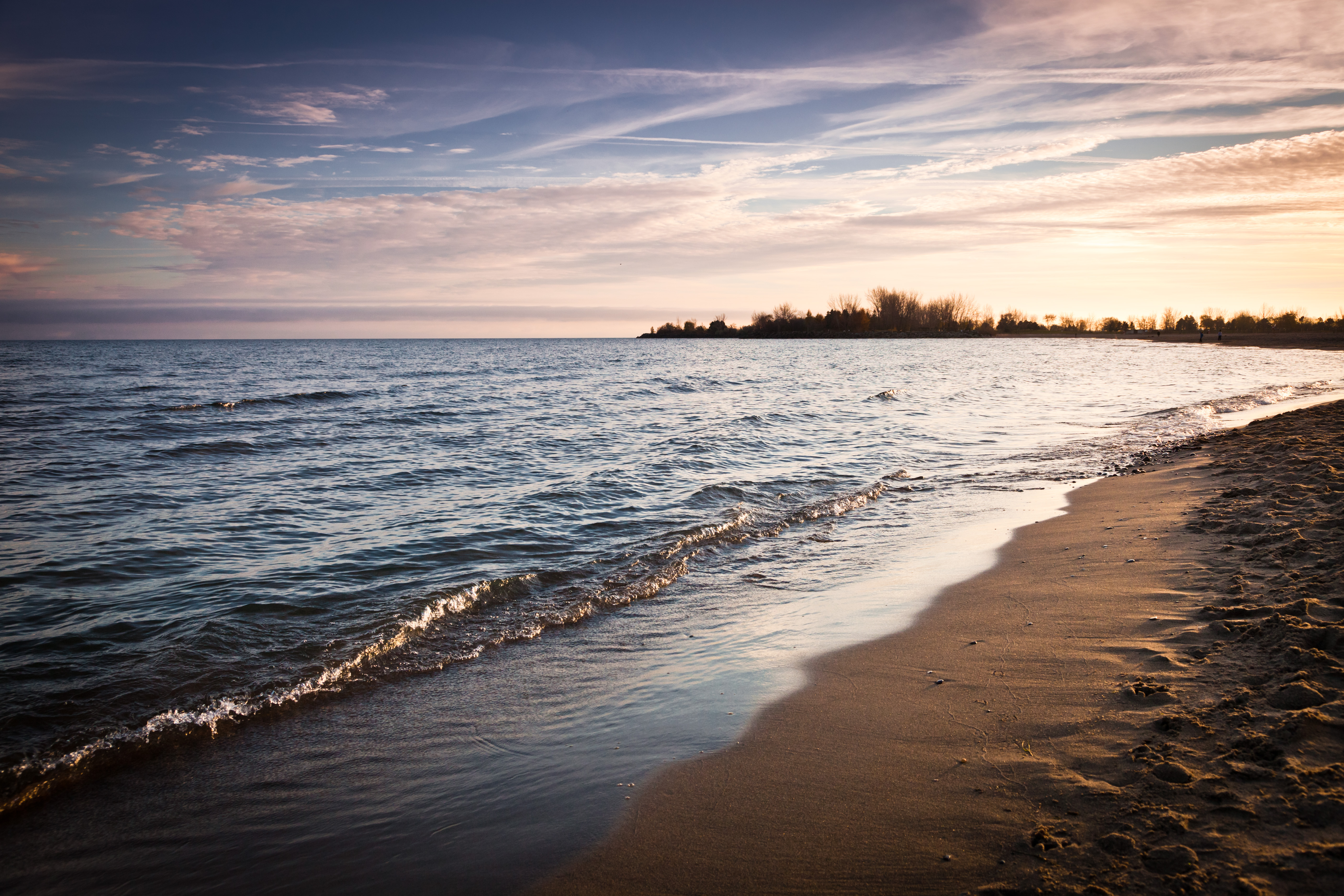
The beach at Ashbridge's Bay Park. The park is situated next to Woodbine Beach, along the eastern part of the Toronto waterfront.

- Albert Campbell Square – located at Scarborough Civic Centre
- Alexander Muir Memorial Gardens
- Allan Gardens – one of two conservatories in Toronto
- Allan Lamport Stadium and Park
- Arena Gardens – site of the former Mutual Street Arena, the first home of the Toronto Maple Leafs

=== B ===
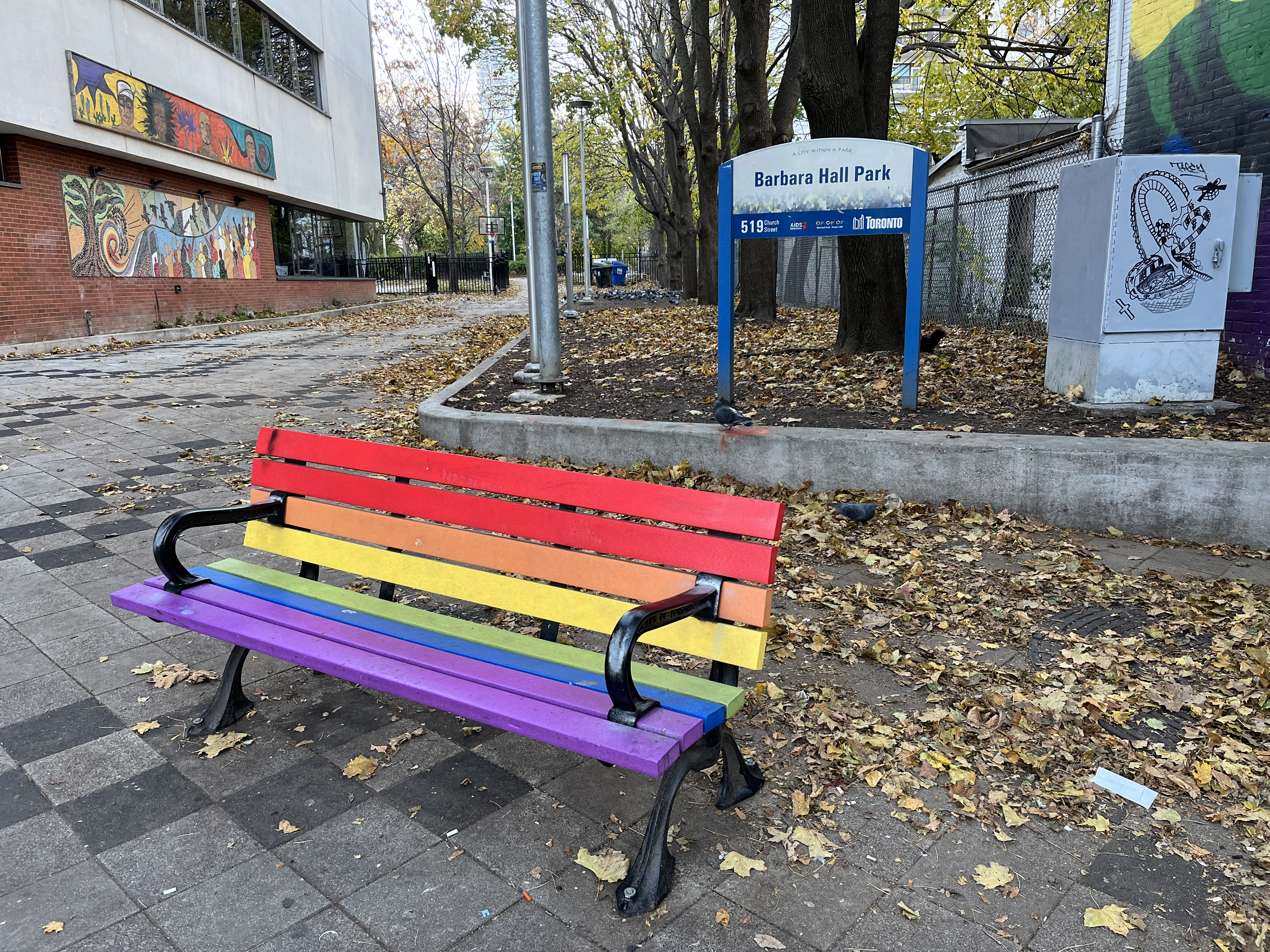
Barbara Hall Park in Church and Wellesley named after former mayor Barbara Hall

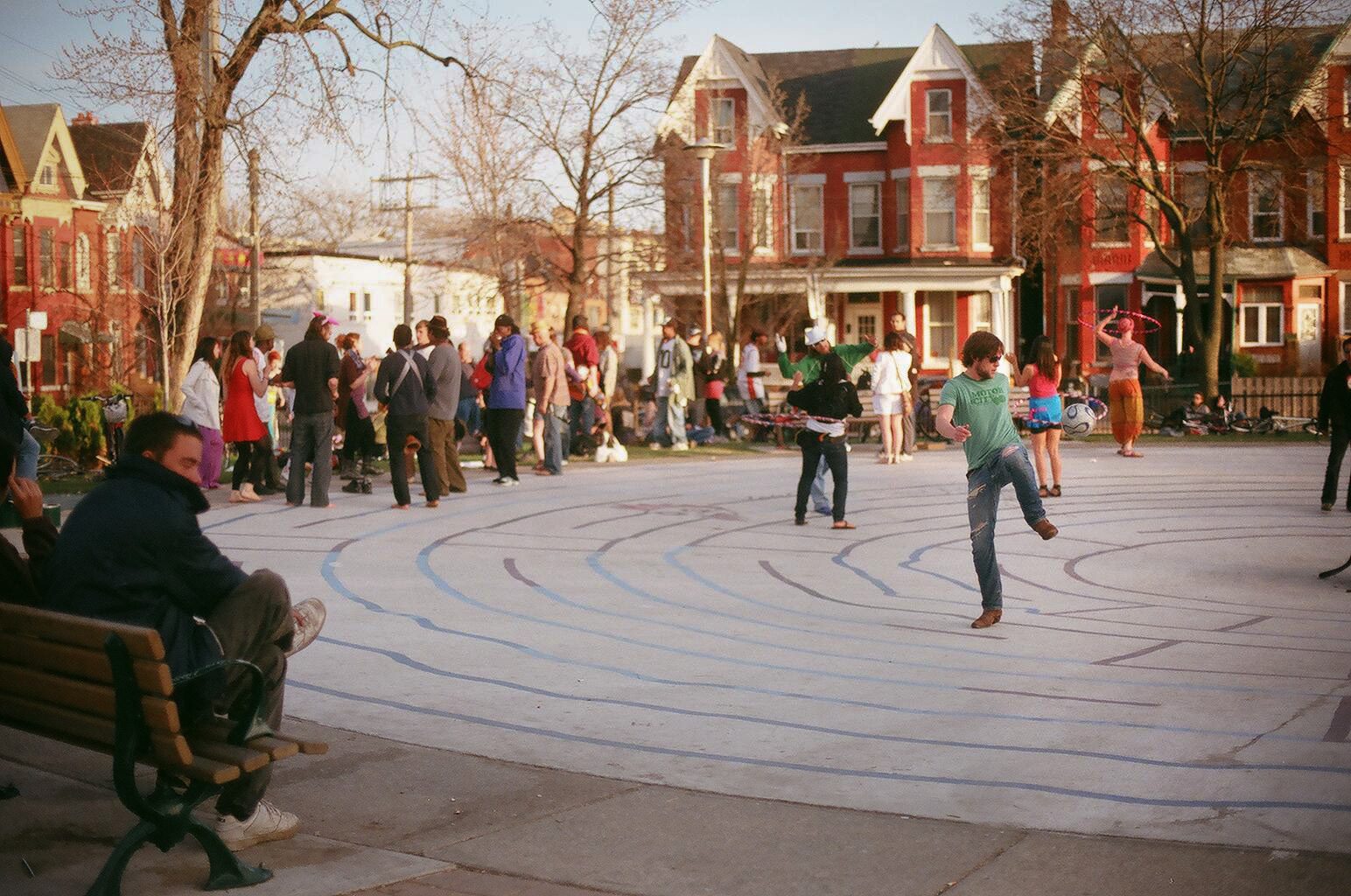
Bellevue Square Park is a small park and public square with a labyrinth located in Kensington Market.

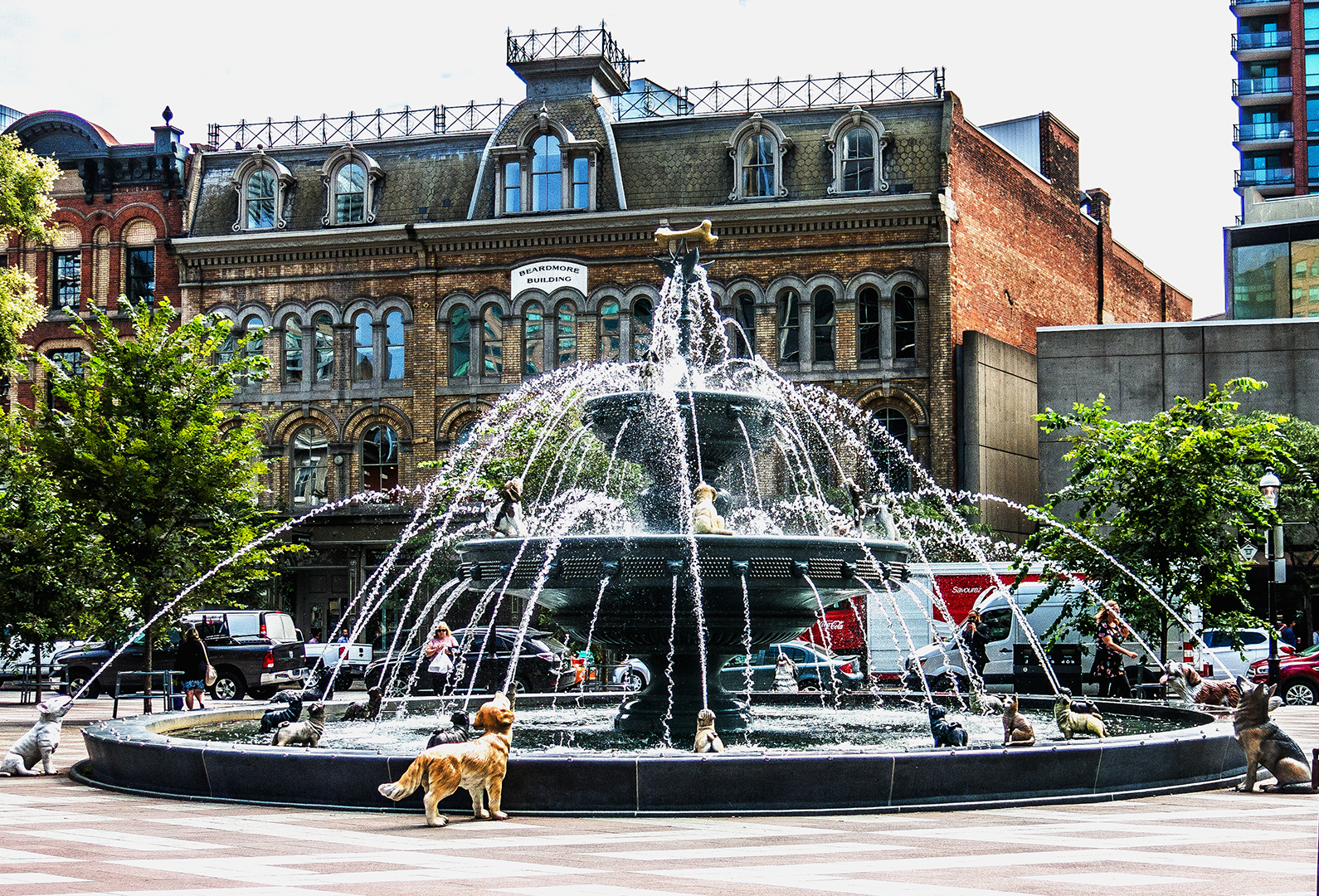
Berczy Park is a small park in Downtown Toronto named after William Berczy.

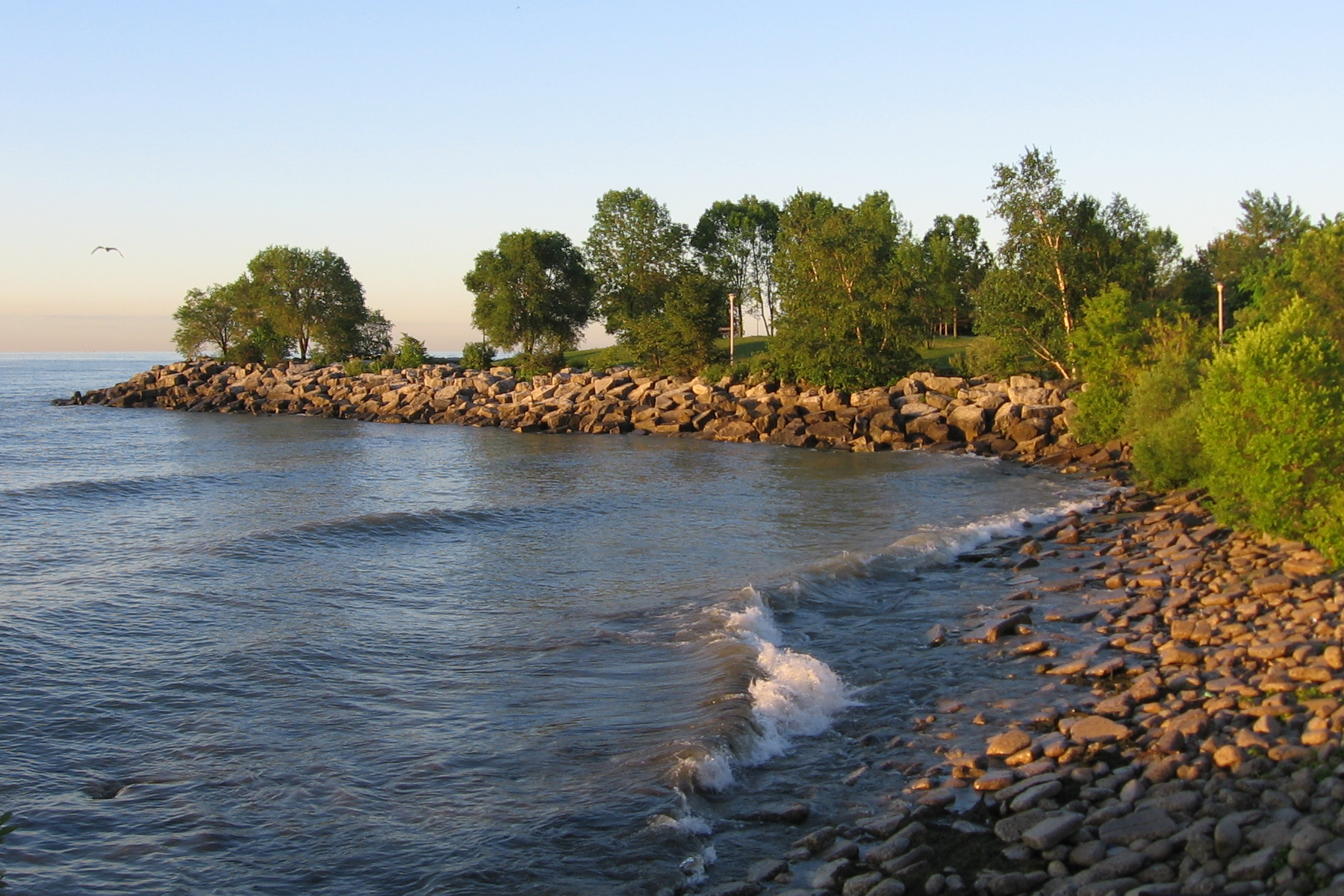
Bluffer's Park is a park situated along the Scarborough Bluffs.

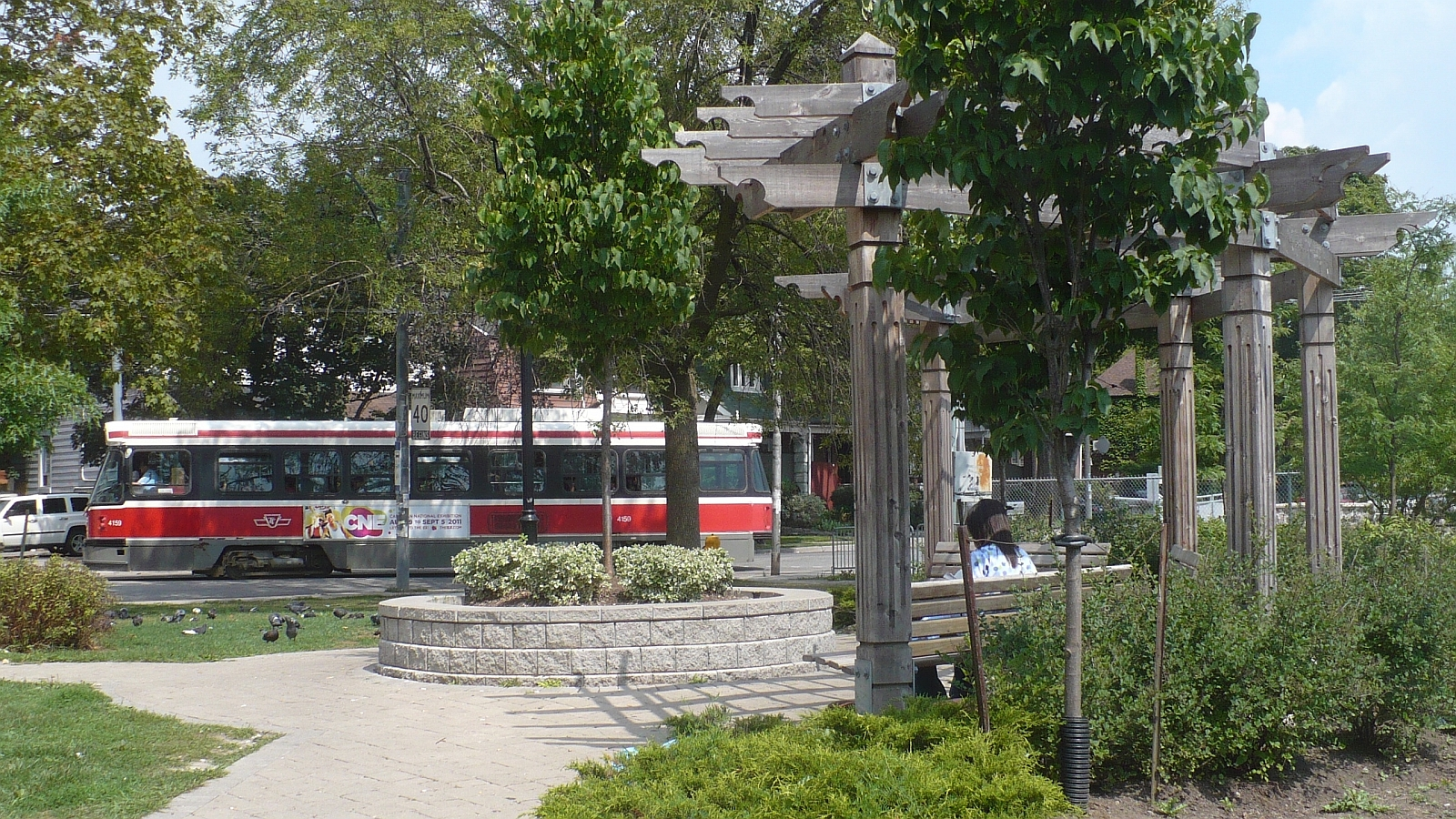
The Broadview Subway Station Parkette is one of many parkettes operated by the City of Toronto.

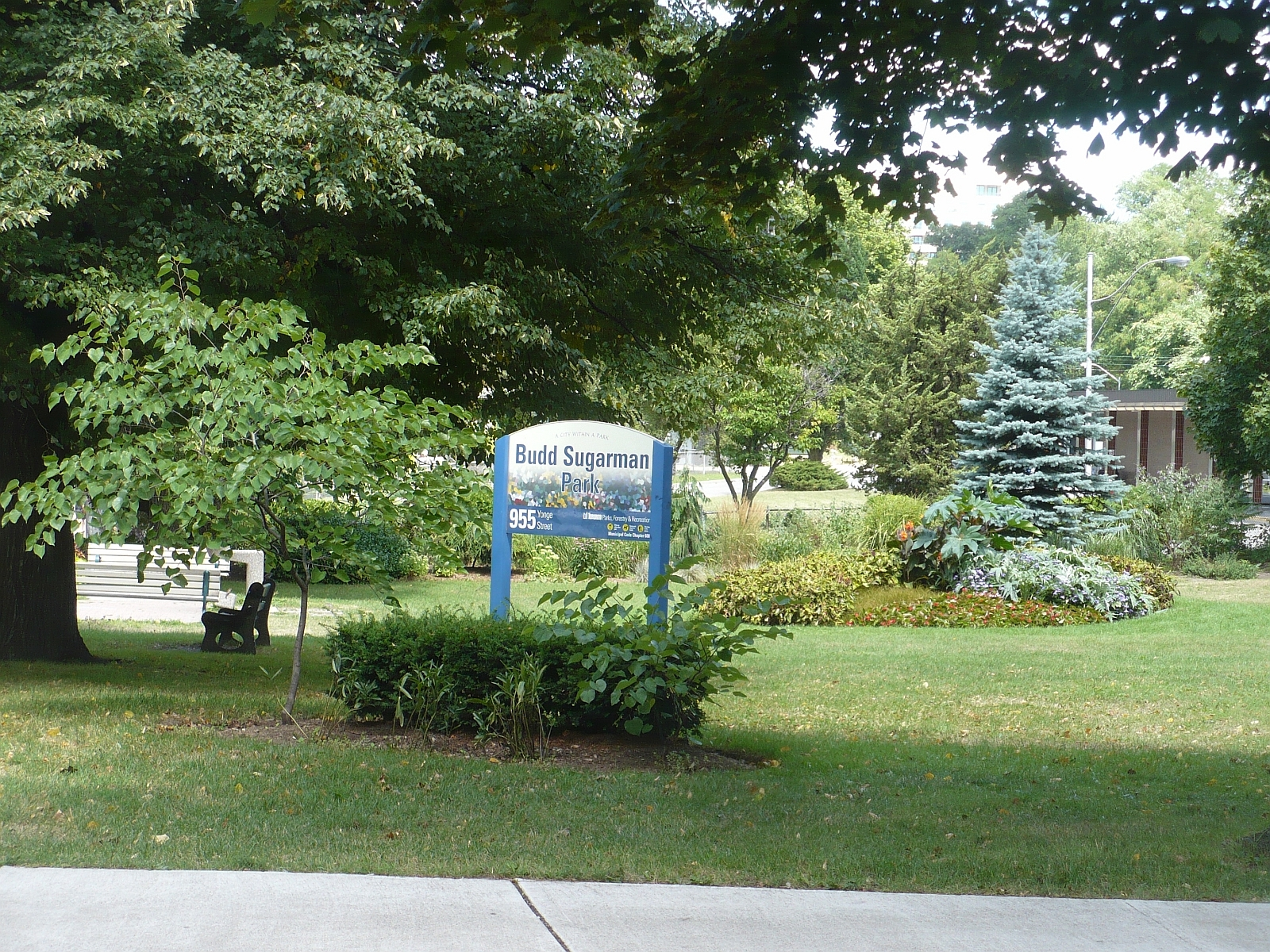
Budd Sugarman Park is a local park located next to Rosedale station.

- Barbara Hall Park
- Beaty Parkette
- Berczy Park (named for William Berczy) – located adjacent to Gooderham Building
- Biidaasige Park
- Birchmount Park and Stadium
- Bloor - Bedford Parkette
- Bloor - Parliament Parkette – formerly Toronto Transit Commission Viaduct Loop
- Bobbie Rosenfeld Park
- Broadview Subway Station Parkette
- Bruce Mackey Park
- Budd Sugarman Park

=== C ===
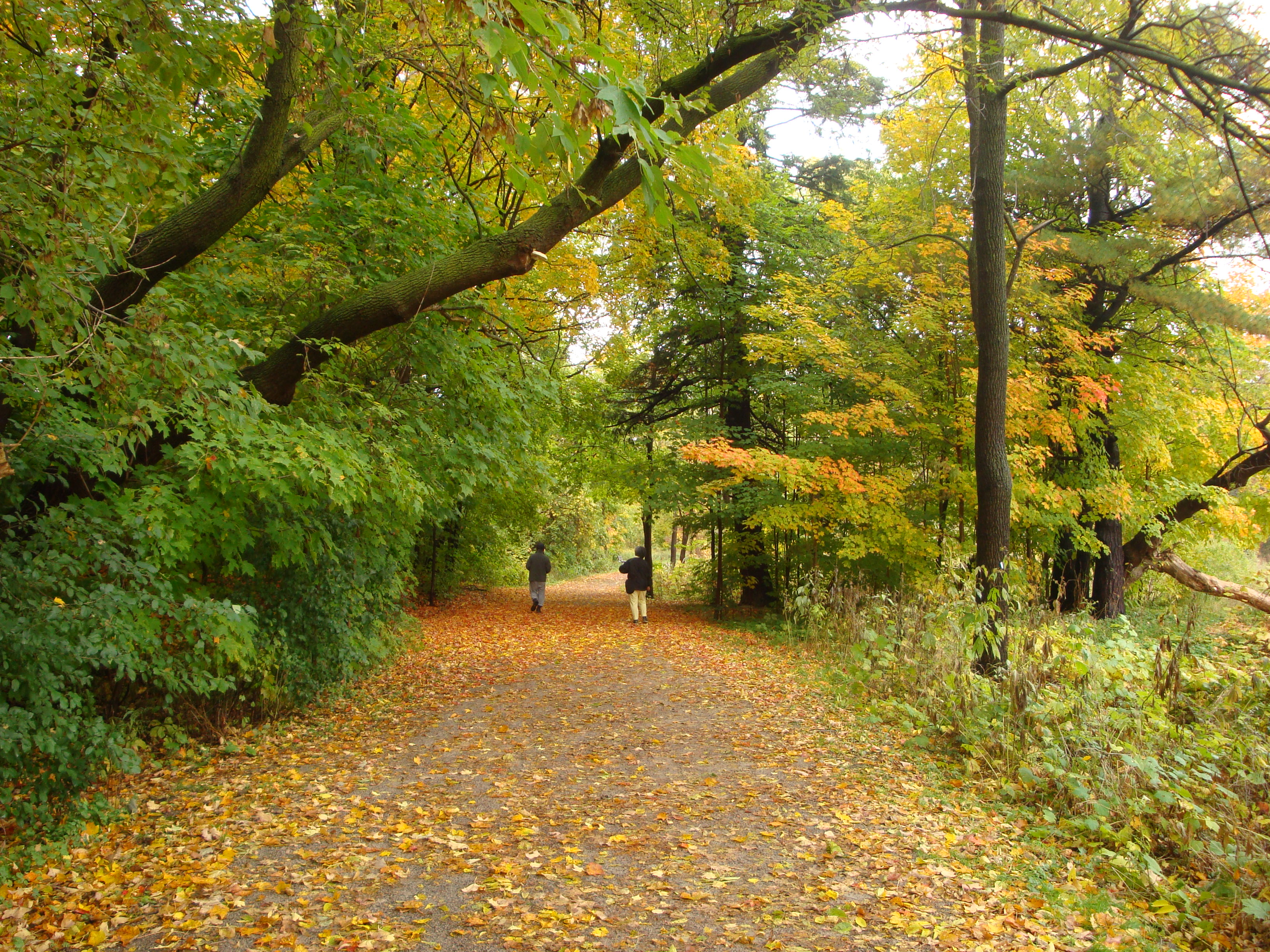
Centennial Park is a large regional park located in the western portion of Etobicoke.

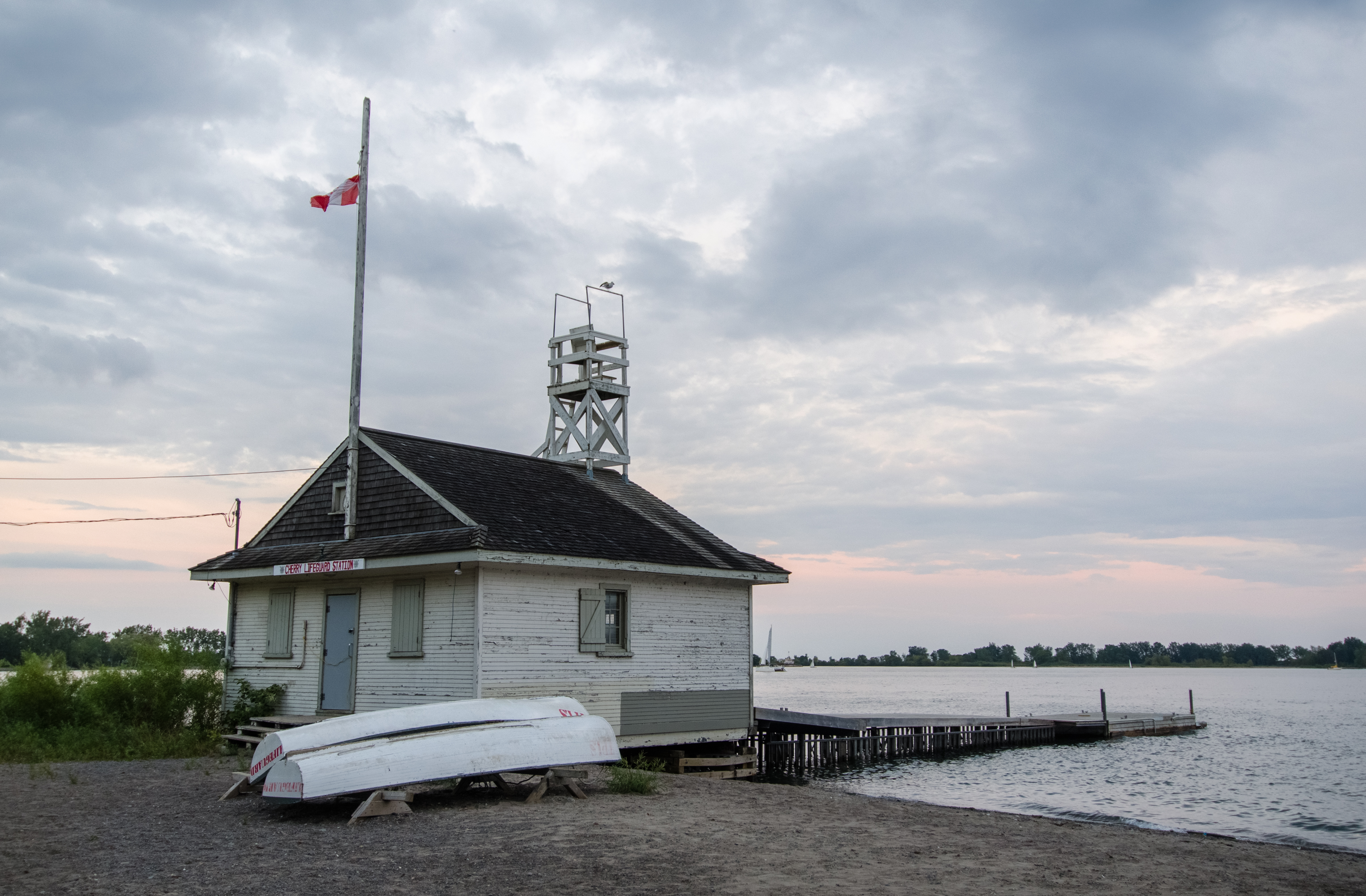
Cherry Beach Park is a municipal park and beach along the waterfront.

- Canoe Landing Park
- Cedarvale Park
- Centennial Park in the former city of Etobicoke
- Centennial Park in the former city of Scarborough
- Cherry Beach
- Chorley Park – site of the former fourth Government House
- Christie Pits
- Clarence Square
- Clarke Beach Park
- Cloud Gardens (Bay Adelaide Gardens and the Cloud Forest Conservatory)
- Colonel Samuel Smith Park
- Corktown Common
- Coronation Park at foot of Strachan Avenue in Old Toronto
- Crothers Woods

=== D ===
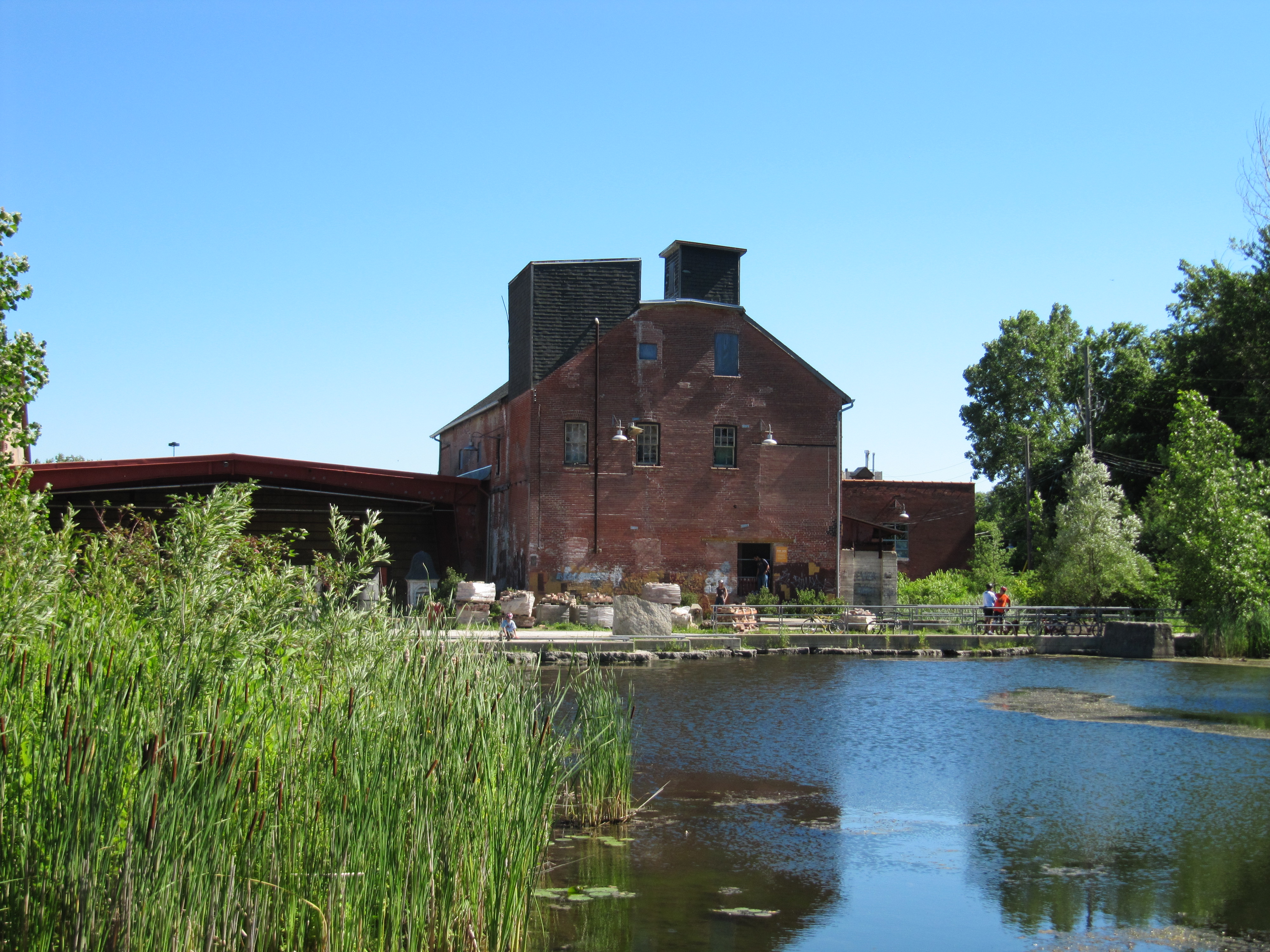
The Don Valley Brick Works was a former clay quarry that was converted into a city park.

- David A. Balfour Park
- David Crombie Park
- Dempsey Park
- Don Mills Trail (a.k.a. Leaside Spur Trail)
- Don Valley Brick Works
- Douglas B. Ford Park
- Downsview Dells Park
- Draper Park
- Dufferin Grove Park

=== E ===
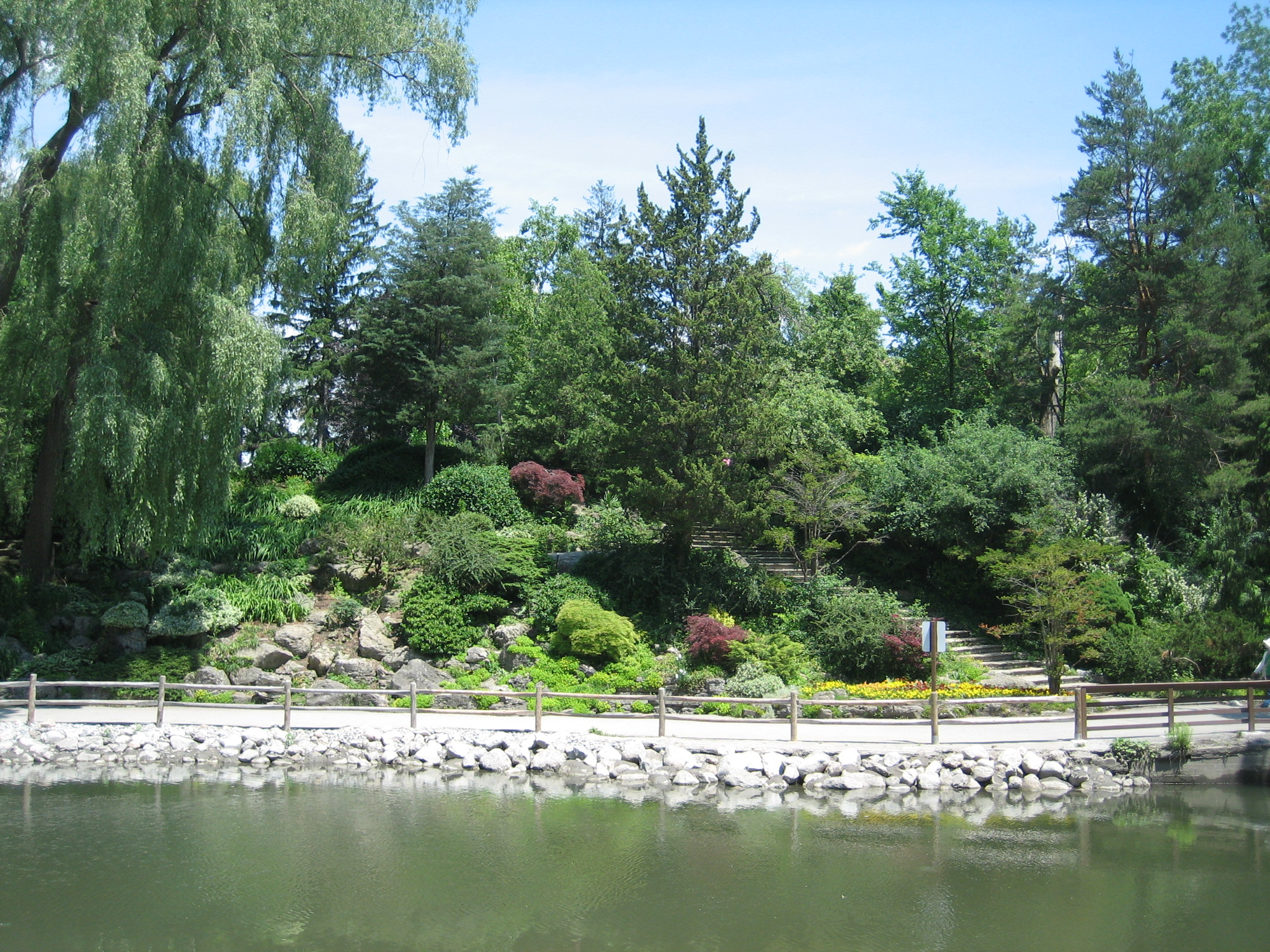
Edwards Gardens is a municipal botanical gardens and is also the site of the Toronto Botanical Garden.

- Earl Bales Park, Barry Zukerman Amphitheatre and North York Ski Centre
- Ed & Anne Mirvish Parkette
- Edwards Gardens
- Eglinton Park
- Étienne Brûlé Park
- E.T. Seton Park

=== F ===
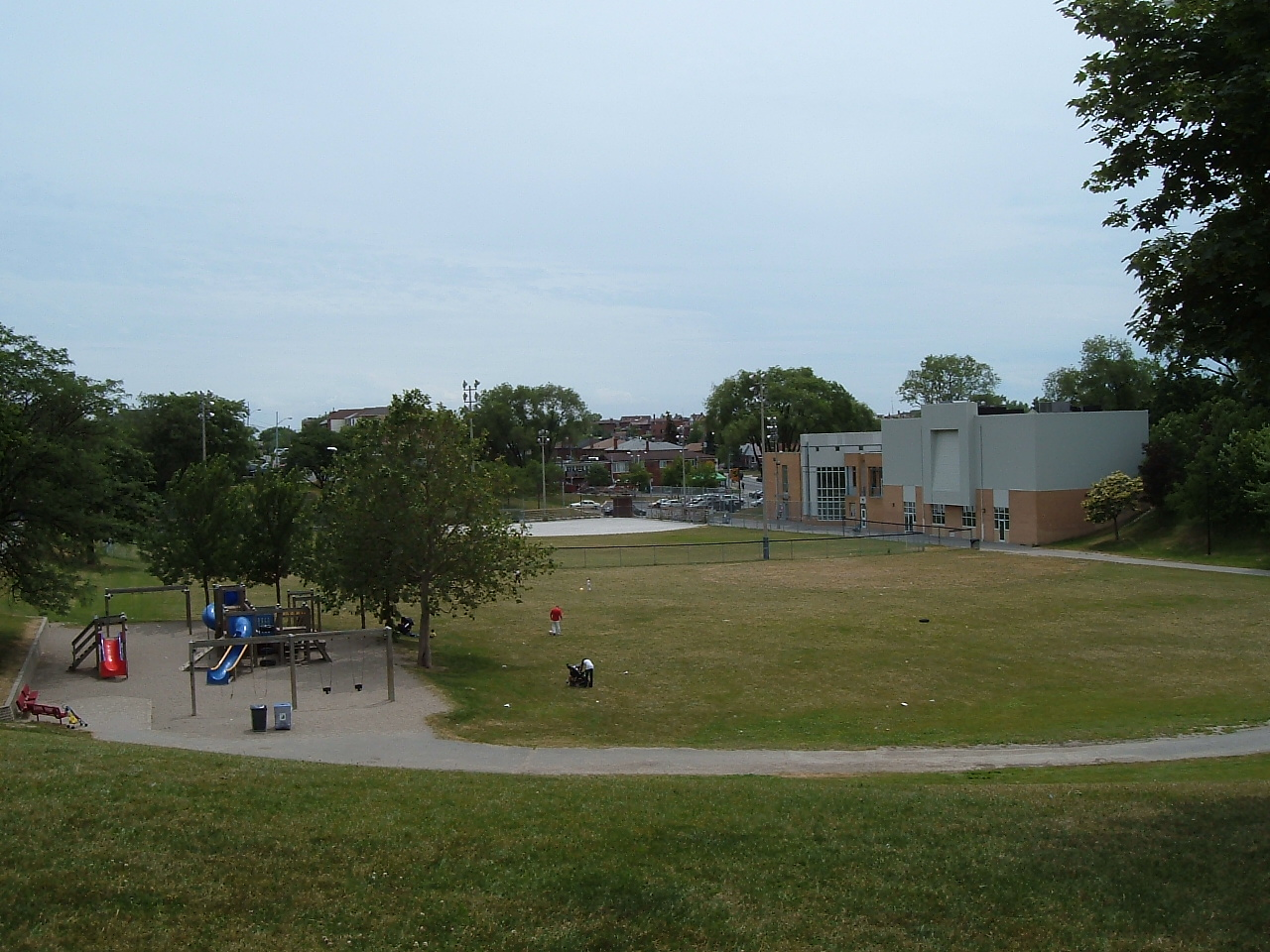
Fairbank Memorial Park

- Fairbank Memorial Park
- Frank Stollery Parkette

=== G ===
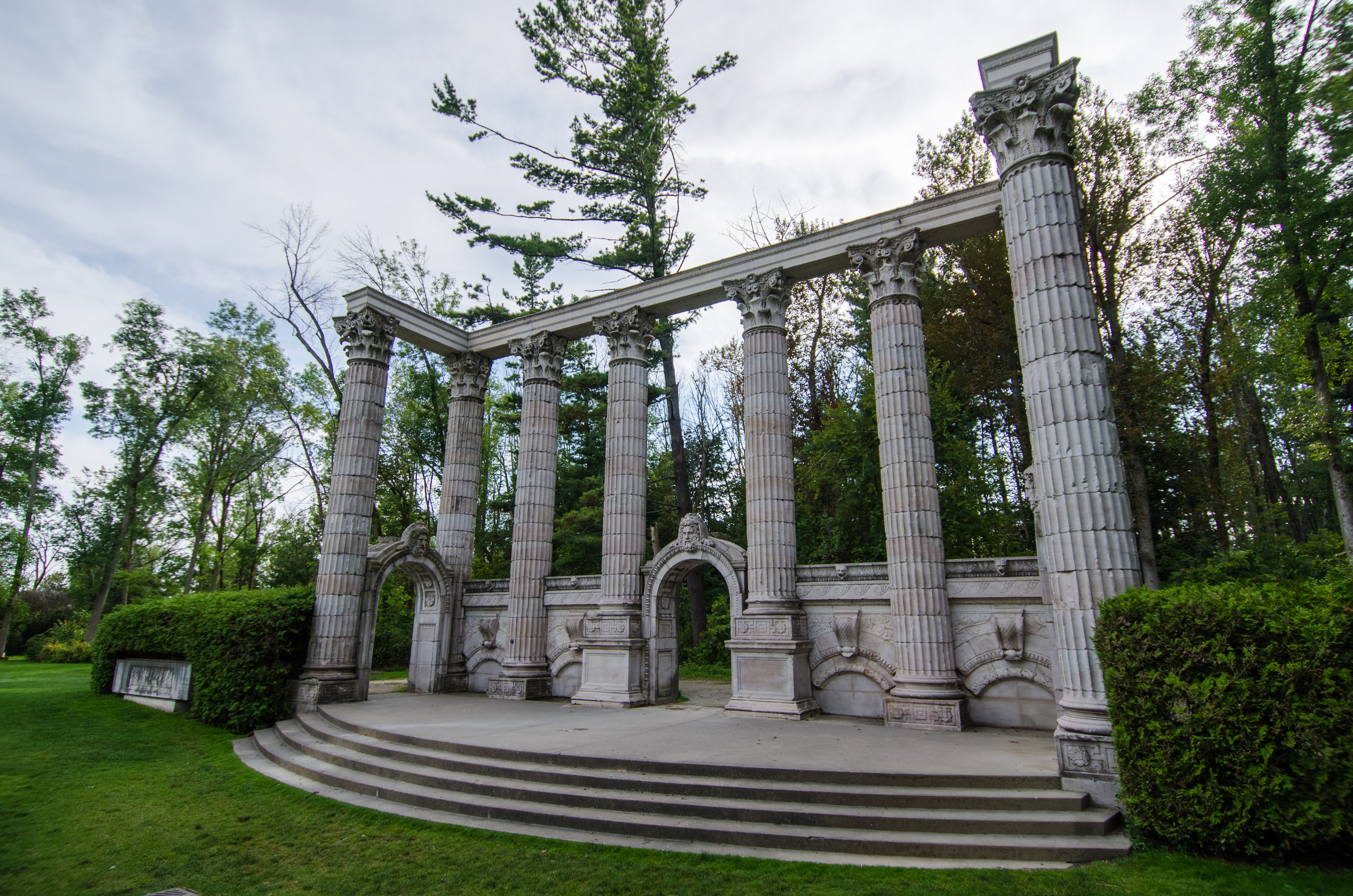
Guild Park and Gardens is a park located along the Scarborough Bluffs. It is home to a collection of relics saved from demolished buildings in Toronto.

- Garrison Creek Park
- George Milbrandt Parkette
- Grange Park
- Guild Park and Gardens
- Gwendolyn MacEwen Park

=== H ===
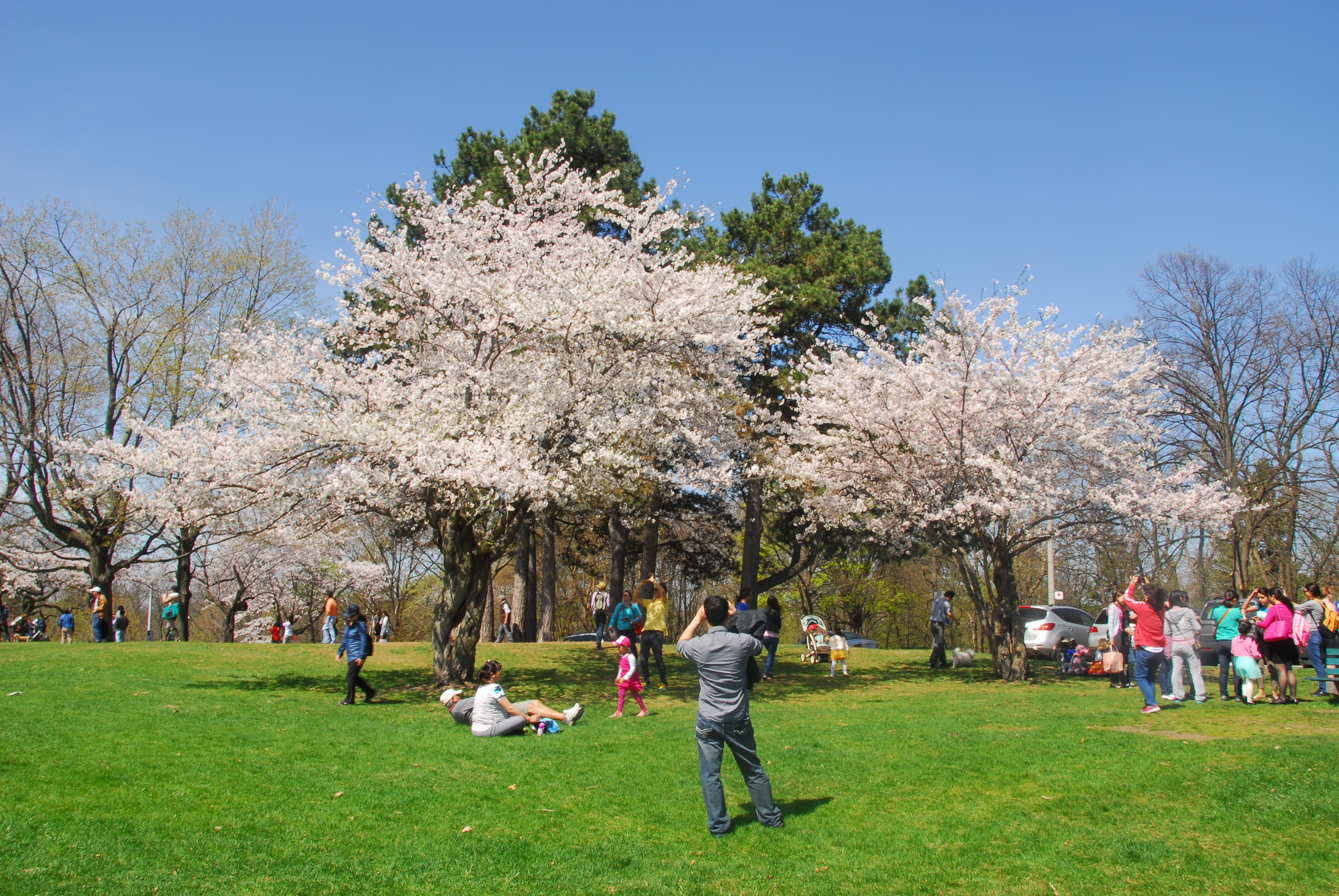
High Park is one of the largest parks in Toronto managed by municipal government. Shown here are the cherry blossom (sakura) trees in the park during hanami.

- Healey Willan Park
- High Park
- Highland Creek
- HTO Park
- Humber Bay Park

=== I–K ===
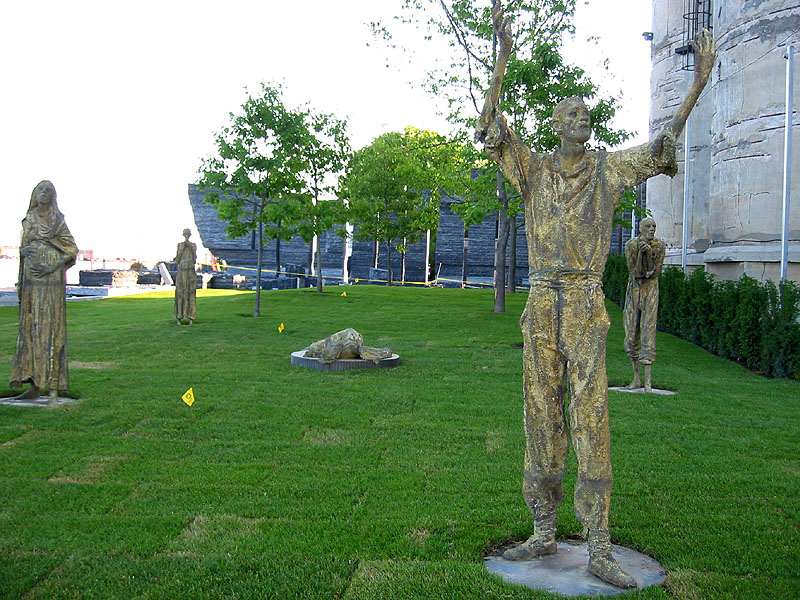
Opened in 2007, Ireland Park commemorates the thousands who fled Ireland during the Great Famine.

- Ireland Park
- James Gardens
- Jaye Robinson Park
- Jesse Ketchum Park
- June Rowlands Park (formerly Davisville Park) and Sharon, Lois & Bram Playground
- Kay Gardner Beltline Park
- Kempton Howard Park
- Kew Gardens Park

=== L ===
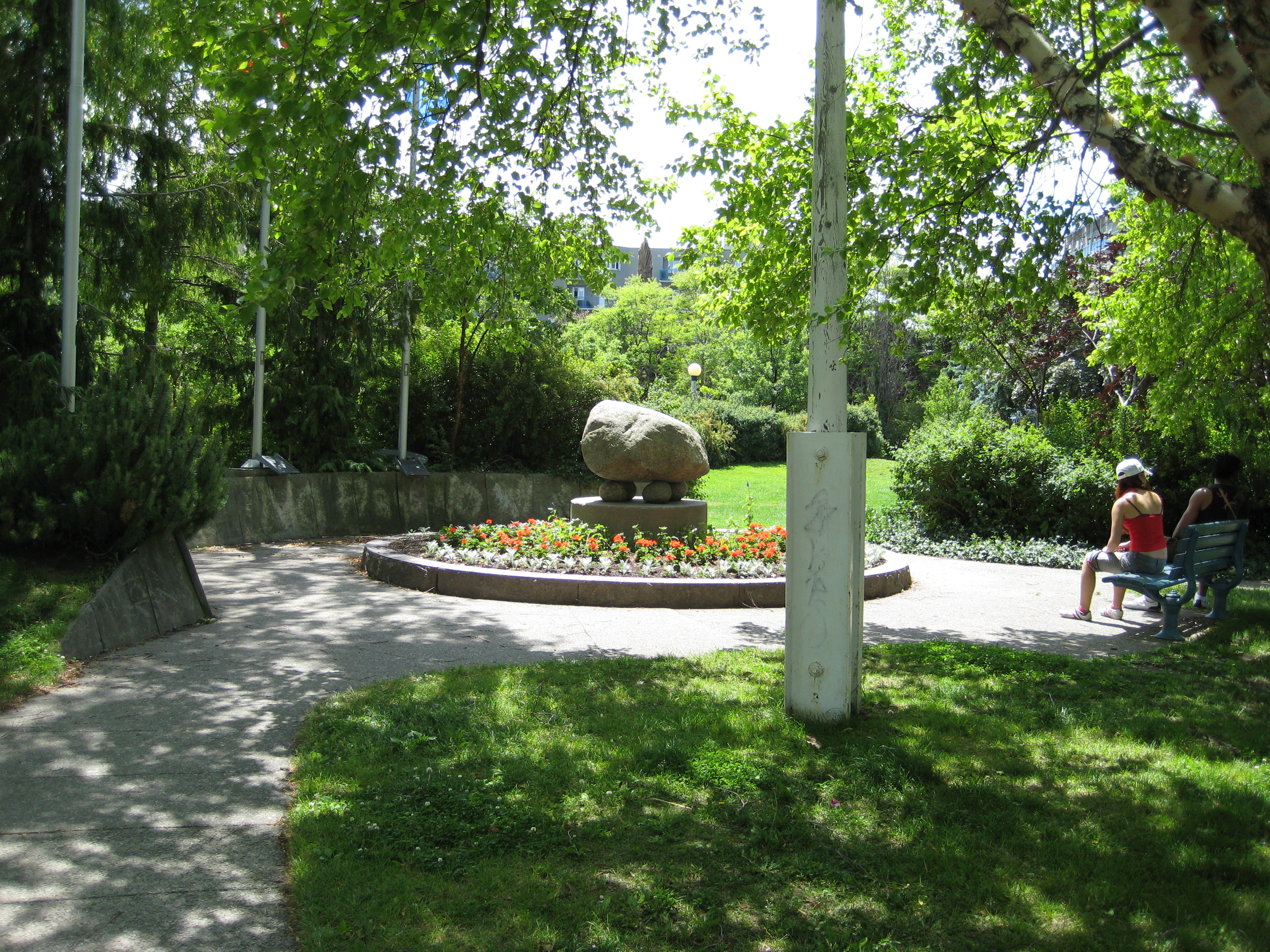
Little Norway Park is named after Little Norway, a Royal Norwegian Air Force training base that occupied the site during World War II.

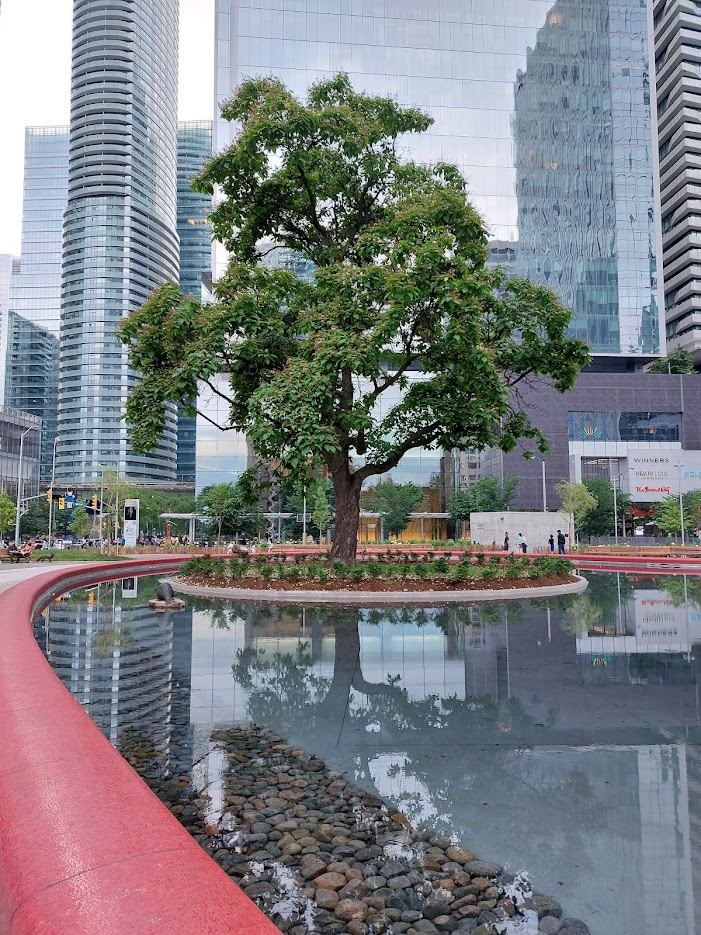
Love Park's pool and lone northern catalpa tree on its own islet

- Little Norway Park
- Loring-Wyle Parkette
- Love Park

=== M ===
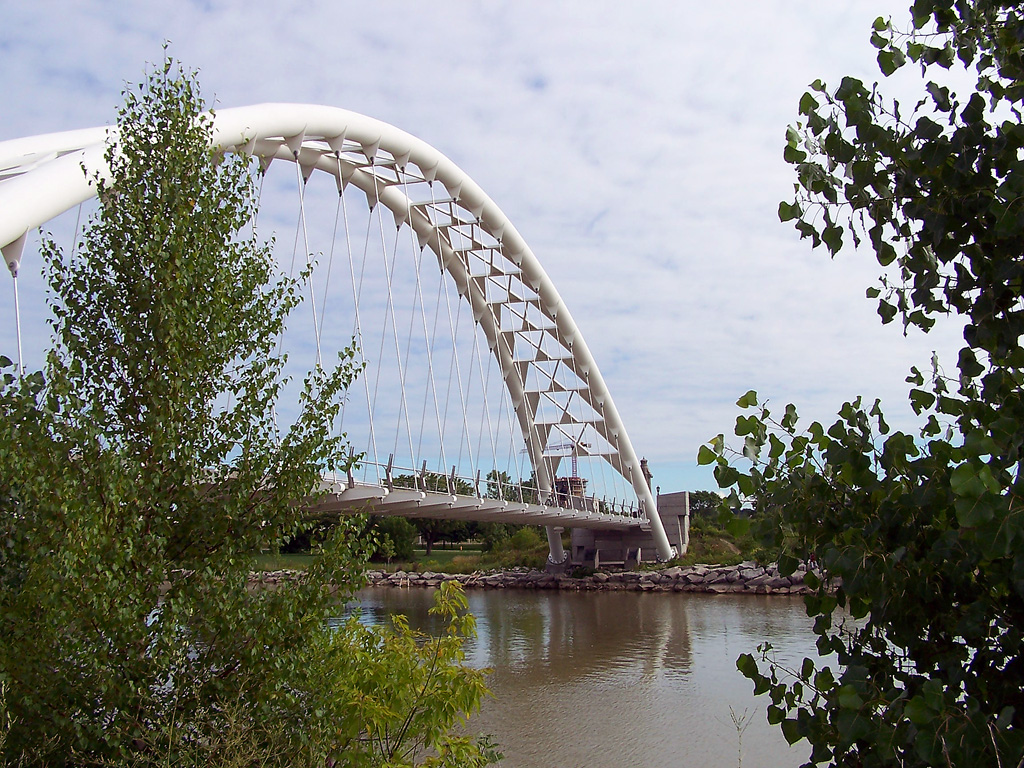
The Humber Bay Arch Bridge on the Martin Goodman Trail, a multi-use path maintained by the City.

- McCormick Park
- McCowan District Park
- Maple Leaf Forever Park
- Marie Curtis Park
- Market Lane Park
- Martin Goodman Trail
- Milliken Park
- Monarch Park
- Morningside Park
- Moss Park

=== N–O ===
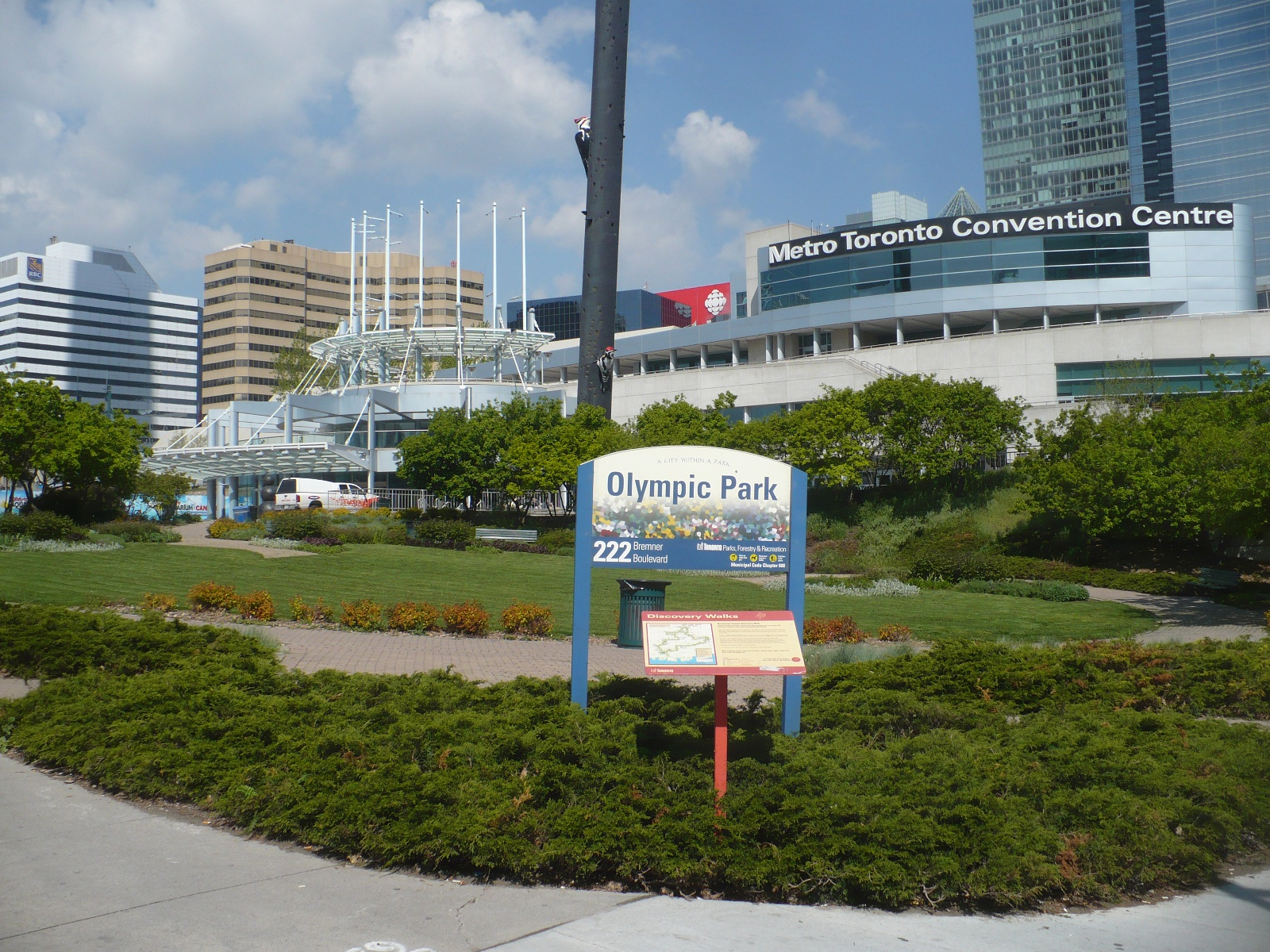
Olympic Park is adjacent to the Metro Toronto Convention Centre's South Building

- Olive Square Park
- Olympic Park

=== P–R ===
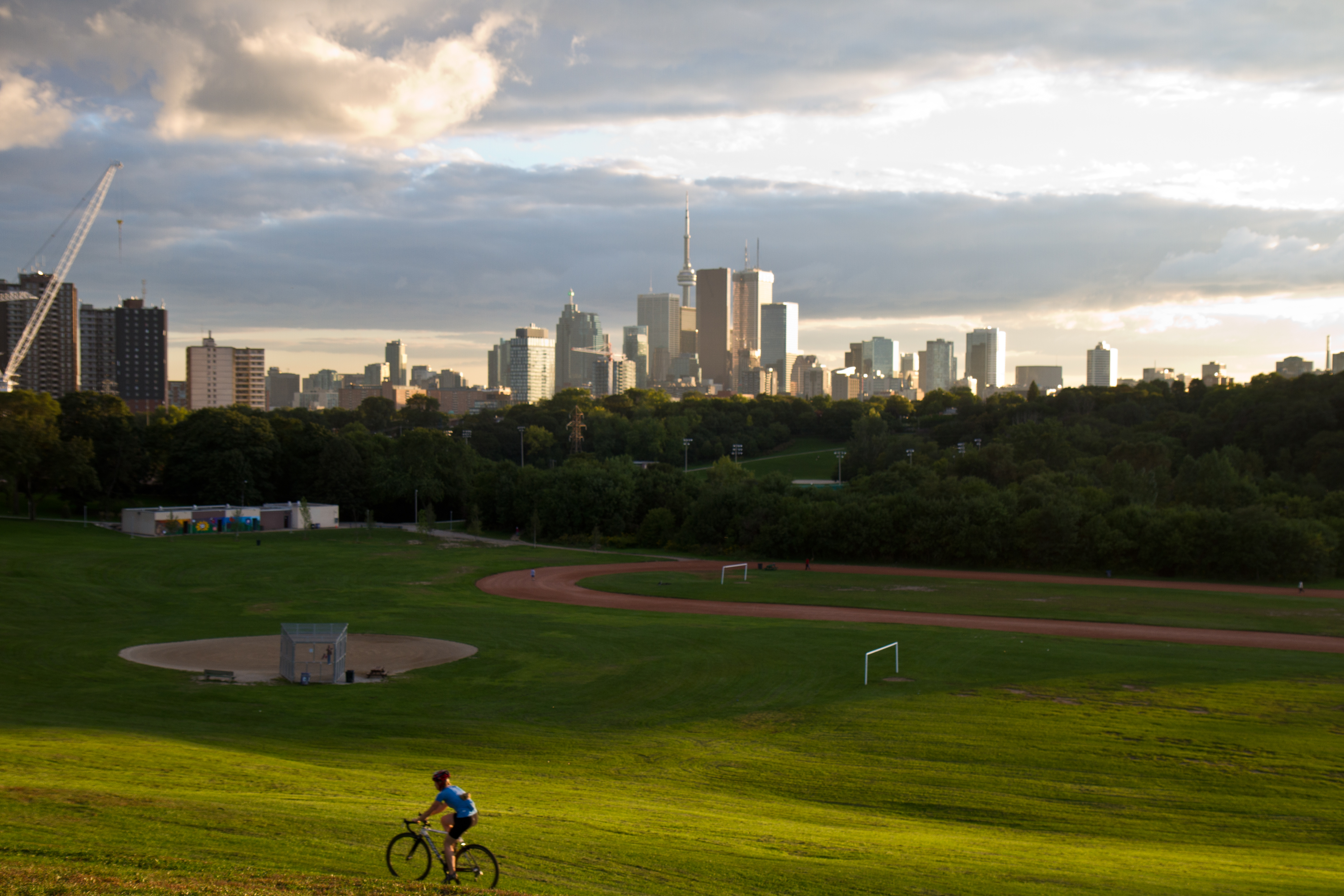
Riverdale Park is a large park that spans the lower Don River.

- Pine Point Park
- Prince Edward Viaduct Parkette
- Raymore Park
- Riverdale Park
- Rosedale Field
- Roundhouse Park
- Runnymede Park

=== S ===
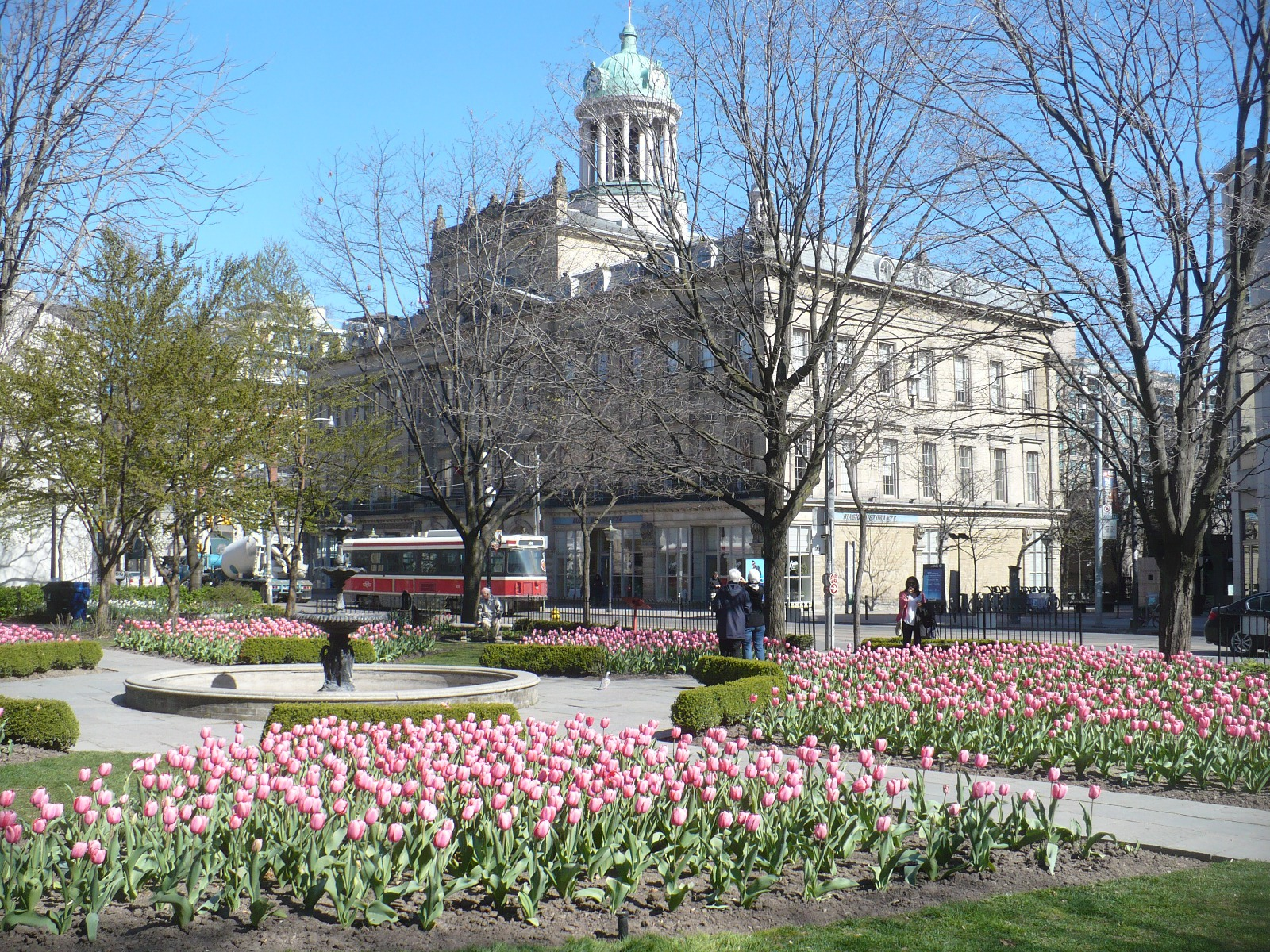
St. James Park is a small park located next to St. James Cathedral Church in the St. Lawrence neighbourhood of downtown Toronto.

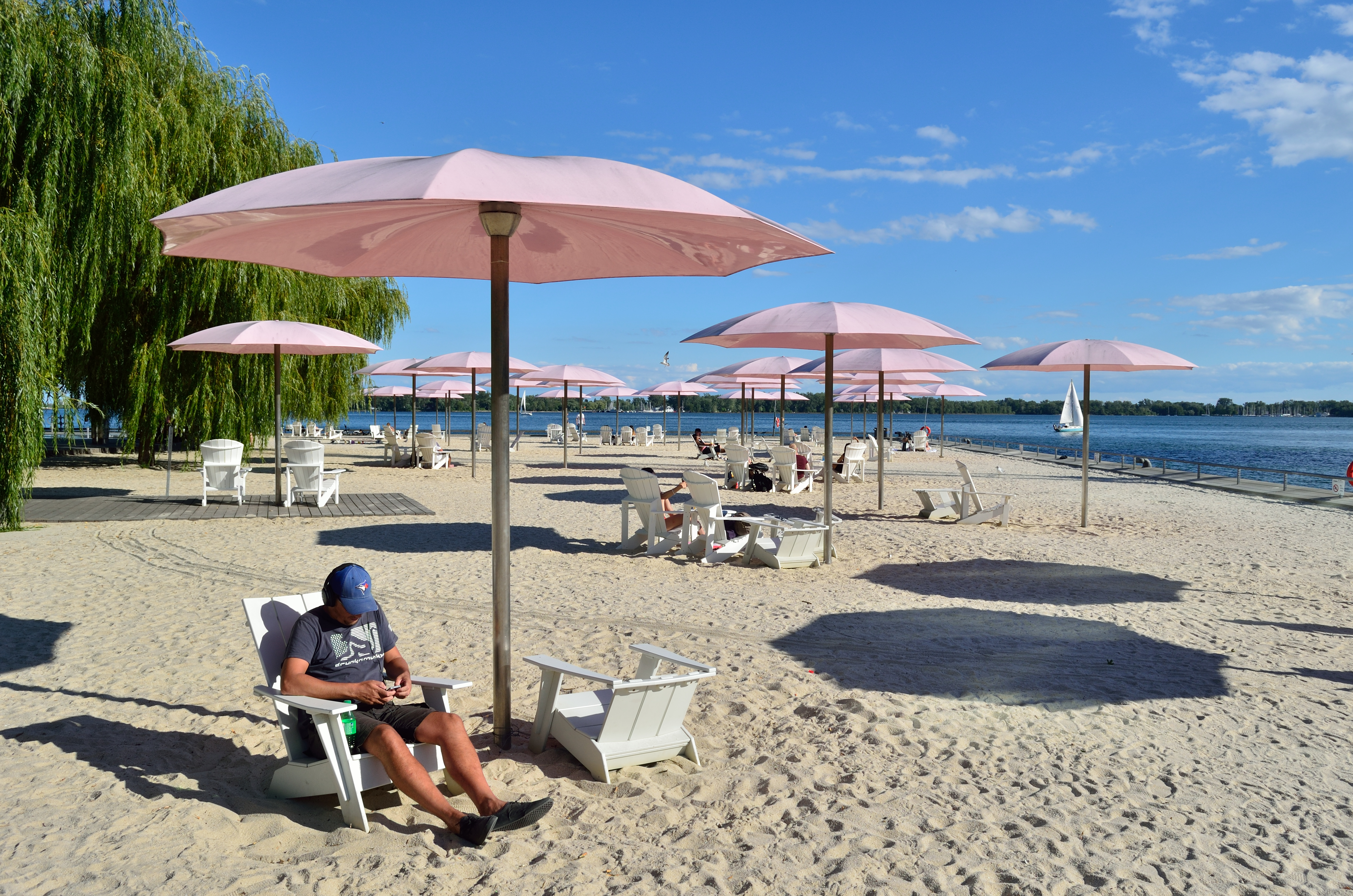
Sugar Beach is an urban beach park located in East Bayfront.

- St. Andrew's Market and Playground
- St. James Park
- Sherbourne Common
- Sugar Beach
- Sunnybrook Park (and Sunnybrook Stables)
- Sunnyside Park

=== T–V ===
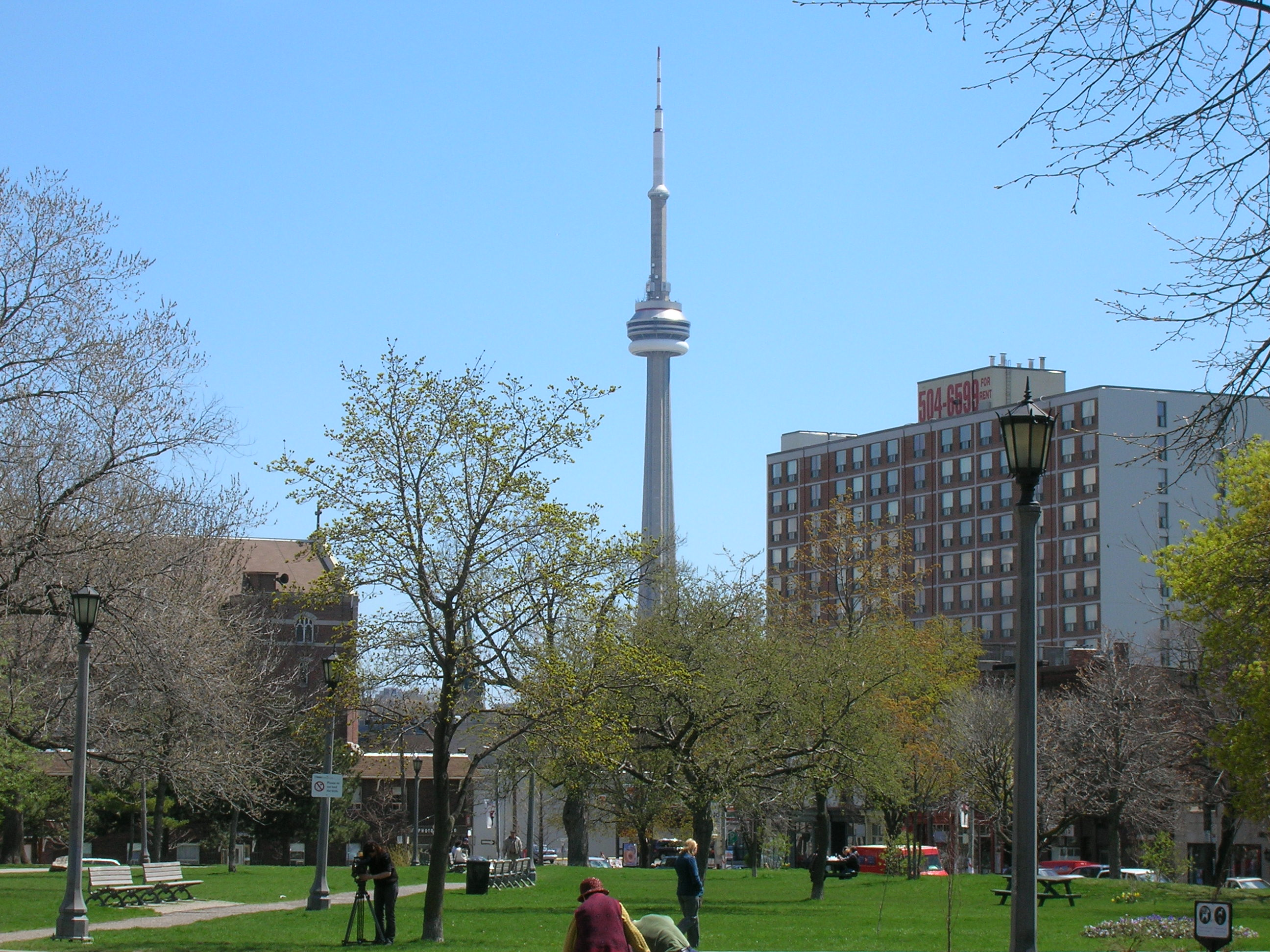
Trinity Bellwoods Park with a view of the CN Tower in the backfround

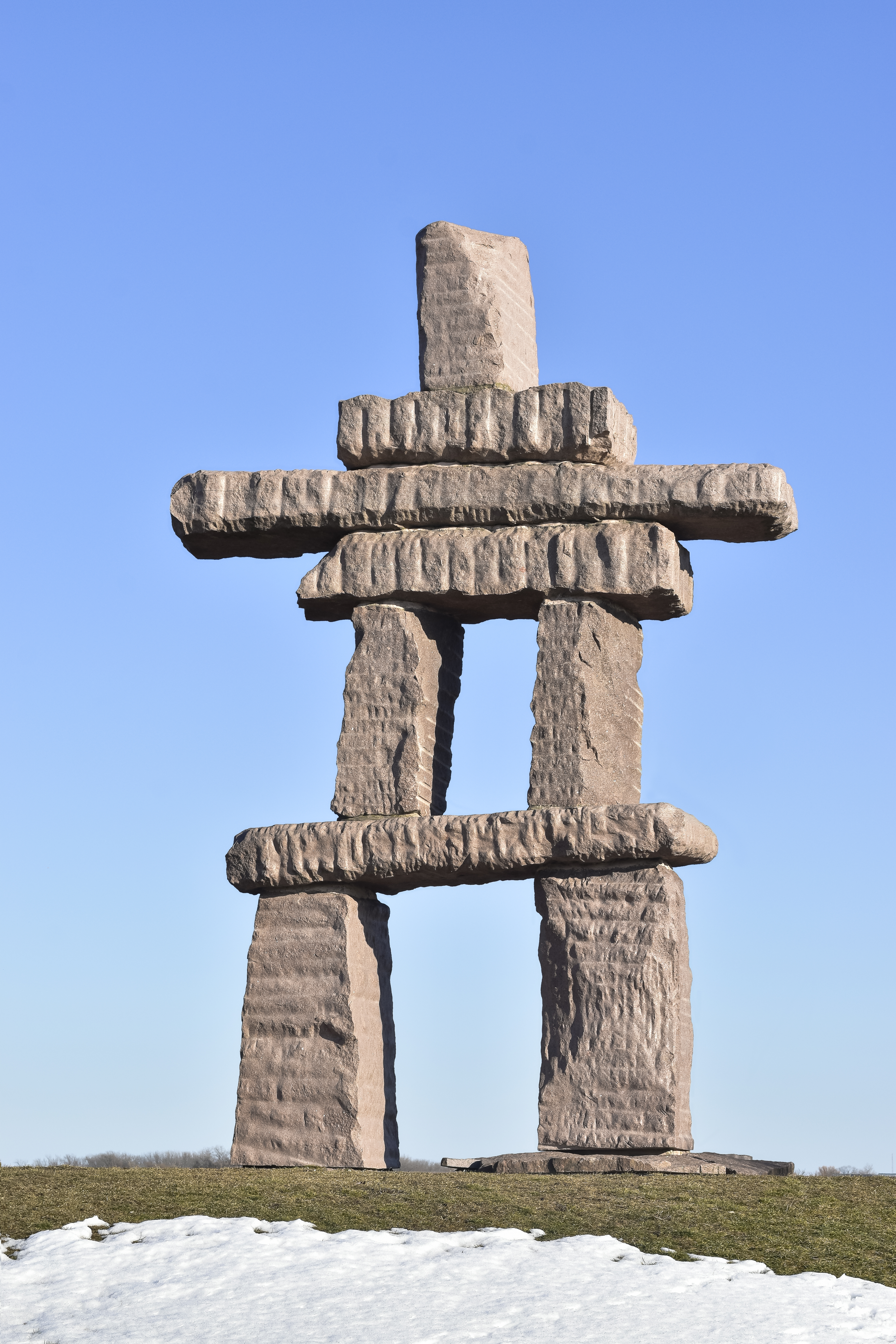
An inuksuk at Toronto Inukshuk Park

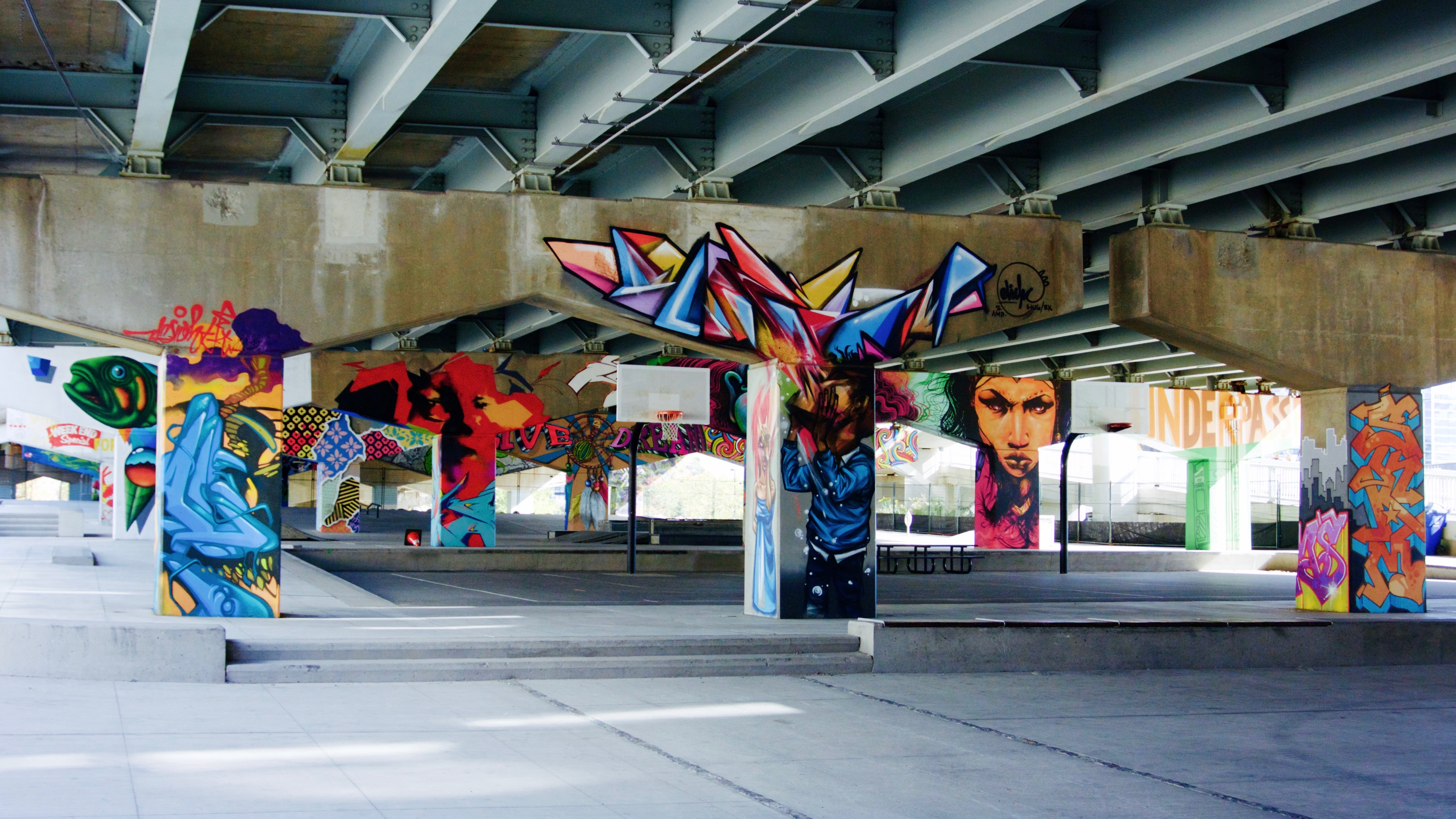
Basketball courts at Underpass Park, an urban park located underneath an underpass in the West Don Lands.

- Taddle Creek Park
- Taylor Creek Park
- Thomson Memorial Park
- Todmorden Mills Park
- Tommy Thompson Park
- Toronto Music Garden
- Toronto Inukshuk Park
- Toronto Islands
- Toronto Track and Field Centre
- Town Hall Square
- Trinity Bellwoods Park and SkyDome baseball diamond (named after the former name of the Rogers Centre multi-purpose stadium)
- Trinity Square and Labyrinth Park
- Underpass Park
- Vale of Avoca

=== W–Z ===
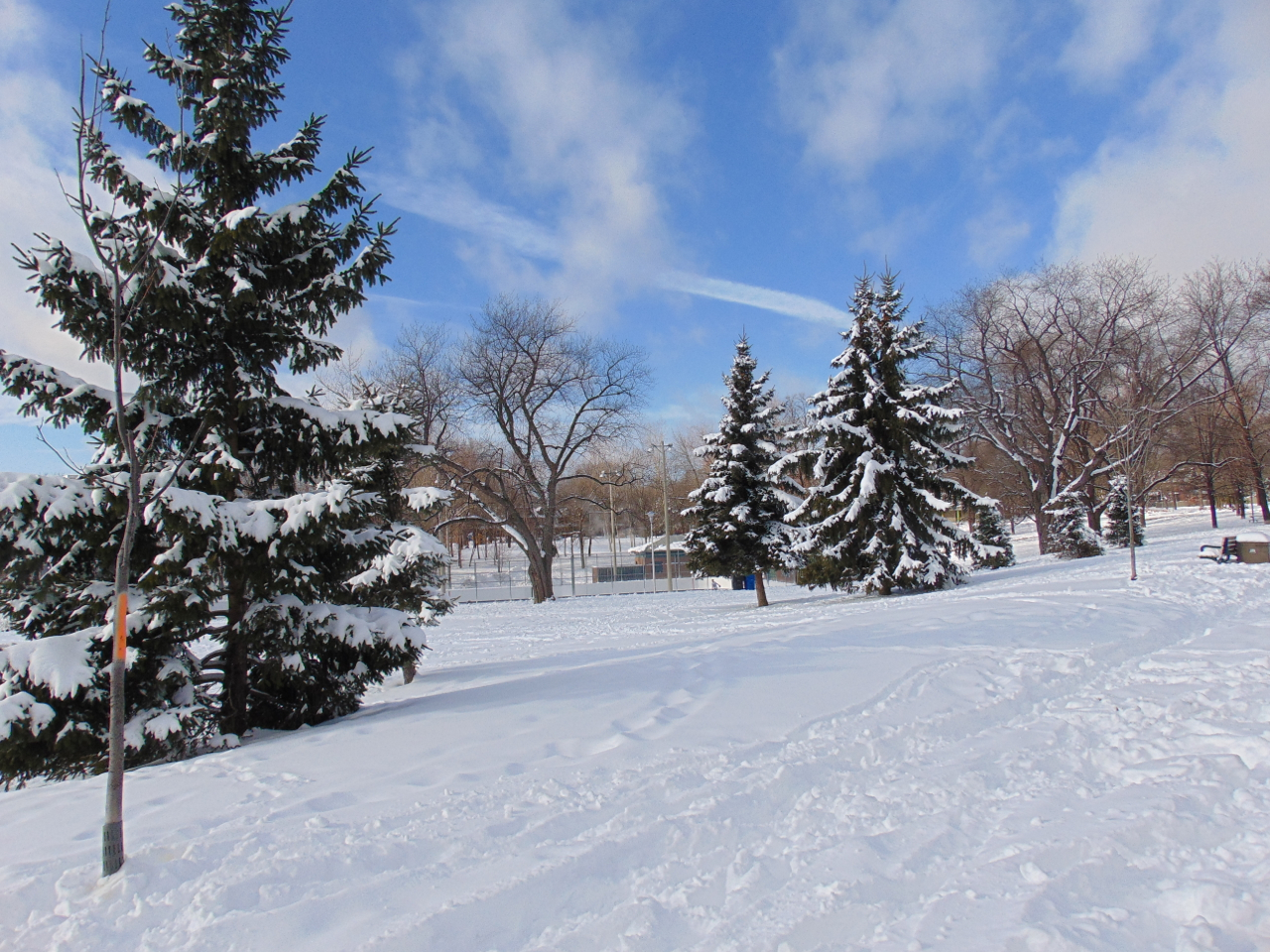
Withrow Park is a municipal park situated in the neighbourhood of Riverdale.

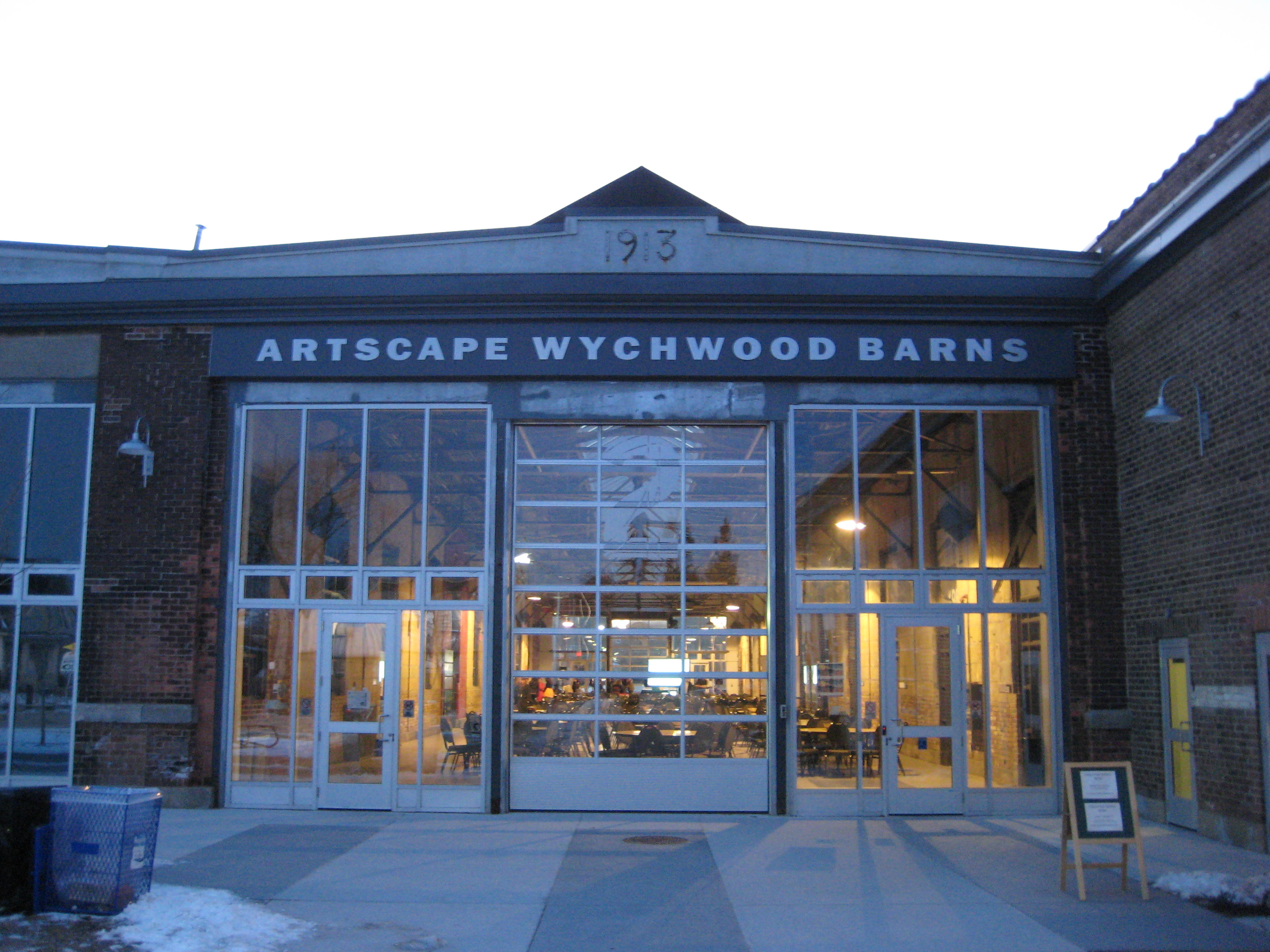
Wychwood Barns is a former streetcar maintenance facility that was converted into a community centre and a park.

- Withrow Park
- Woodbine Park — formerly Greenwood Raceway
- Woodbine Beach Park
- Wychwood Barns Park — former Toronto Transit Commission streetcar barn 1913–1992
- Yorkville Park

=== Former city parks ===
- Finch Meander Area – part of Rouge National Urban Park and Parks Canada Emergency Access Area parking area in Scarborough
- Glen Eagles Vista – part of Rouge National Urban Park Glen Eagles Vista in Scarborough

== Provincial parks ==
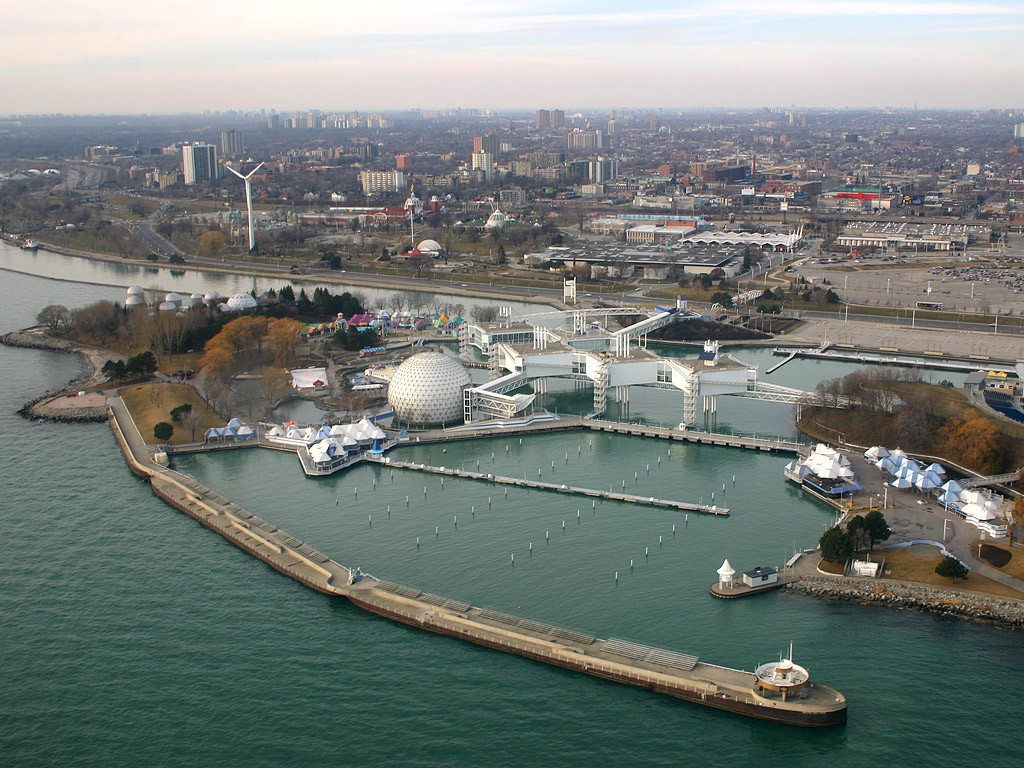
The West Island of Ontario Place in 2006 with Exhibition Place to the north

There are three provincially owned parks in the City of Toronto.

Parks that are owned by the Government of Ontario include:

- Ontario Place — artificially constructed former amusement park and entertainment and event facility on the waterfront south of Exhibition Place in Old Toronto and is being redeveloped; includes RBC Amphitheatre (which replaced The Forum), which is on a separate island and has separate admission and will also be redeveloped
- Queen's Park — park setting on the south and north ends of the Ontario Legislative Building in Old Toronto. The southern portion of the park is owned by the provincial government, while the northern portion of the park is owned by the University of Toronto and leased to the municipal government for 999 years; not to be confused with Queen's Greenbelt in North York
- Trillium Park — artificially constructed park with a natural-looking landscape planted with native tree and shrub species; built on the site of a former Ontario Place parking lot

== Federal parks ==
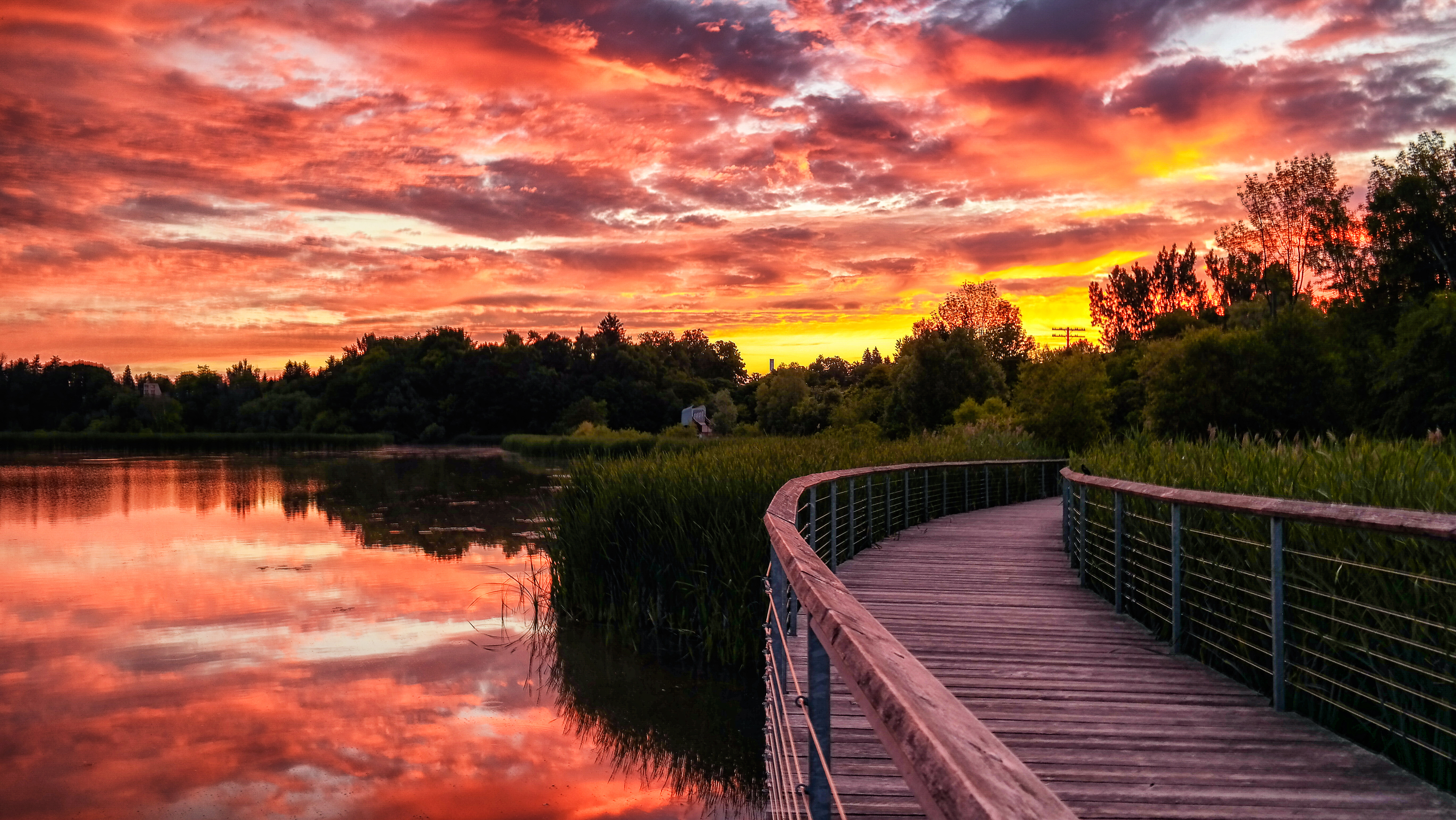
Rouge National Urban Park, a national park managed by Parks Canada, is situated in the eastern portion of Toronto.

There are three federally owned parks in the City of Toronto, including one national park managed by Parks Canada, a federal agency of the Government of Canada.

Parks owned by the federal government include:

- Downsview Park — converted military base CFB Downsview / Downsview Airport in North York; Rogers Stadium is located there
- Harbourfront Park — waterfront promenade and urban park amongst residential and commercial development along Queens Quay West in downtown Toronto
- Rouge National Urban Park — a national urban park and nature preserve centred around the Rouge Valley in Scarborough with some agricultural uses and extends to Markham

== Toronto and Region Conservation Authority ==
The Toronto and Region Conservation Authority (TRCA) (an agency of the provincial government) is one of 36 conservation authorities in Ontario, Canada with a jurisdiction covering 3,467 square kilometres (1,339 sq mi) over nine different watersheds. The TRCA operates many conservation areas in the Toronto region, including three completely or primarily within the City of Toronto limits:

- The Village at Black Creek (formerly Black Creek Pioneer Village) primarily in North York with a very small section in Vaughan
- Tommy Thompson Park (Leslie Street Spit) on the Toronto waterfront
- Humber Bay Shores Waterfront Park — a park linking City-owned Palace Pier Park and Humber Bay Park East on the south side of Marine Parade Drive to Park Lawn Road in Etobicoke

TRCA briefly managed part of Rouge Park before it was transferred to Parks Canada.

== See also ==
- Fauna of Toronto
- Native trees in Toronto
- Toronto ravine system
- List of Toronto recreation centres
- Toronto Zoo, paid year-round attraction in the Rouge Valley owned by the City of Toronto and operated by a board of management
