= Taddle Creek Park =

Park in Toronto, Ontario, Canada

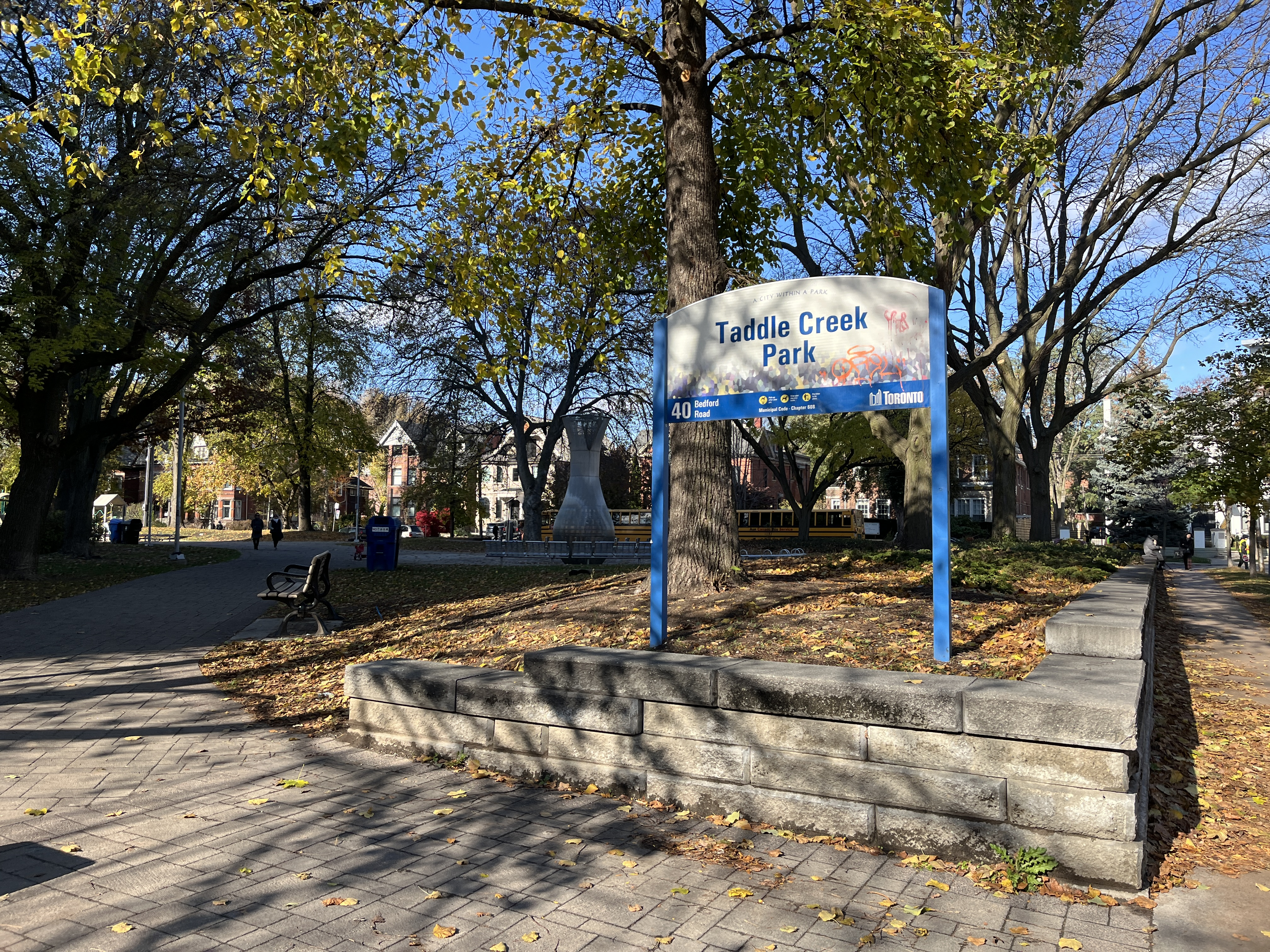
- The park in 2023

- Location within Ontario
- Coordinates: 43°40′12″N 79°23′55″W
- Created: 1976
- Operator: Toronto Parks
- Website: Official website

Taddle Creek Park is a small but busy park at the southwest corner of Lowther Avenue and Bedford Road, in The Annex area of Toronto.

== Description and history ==
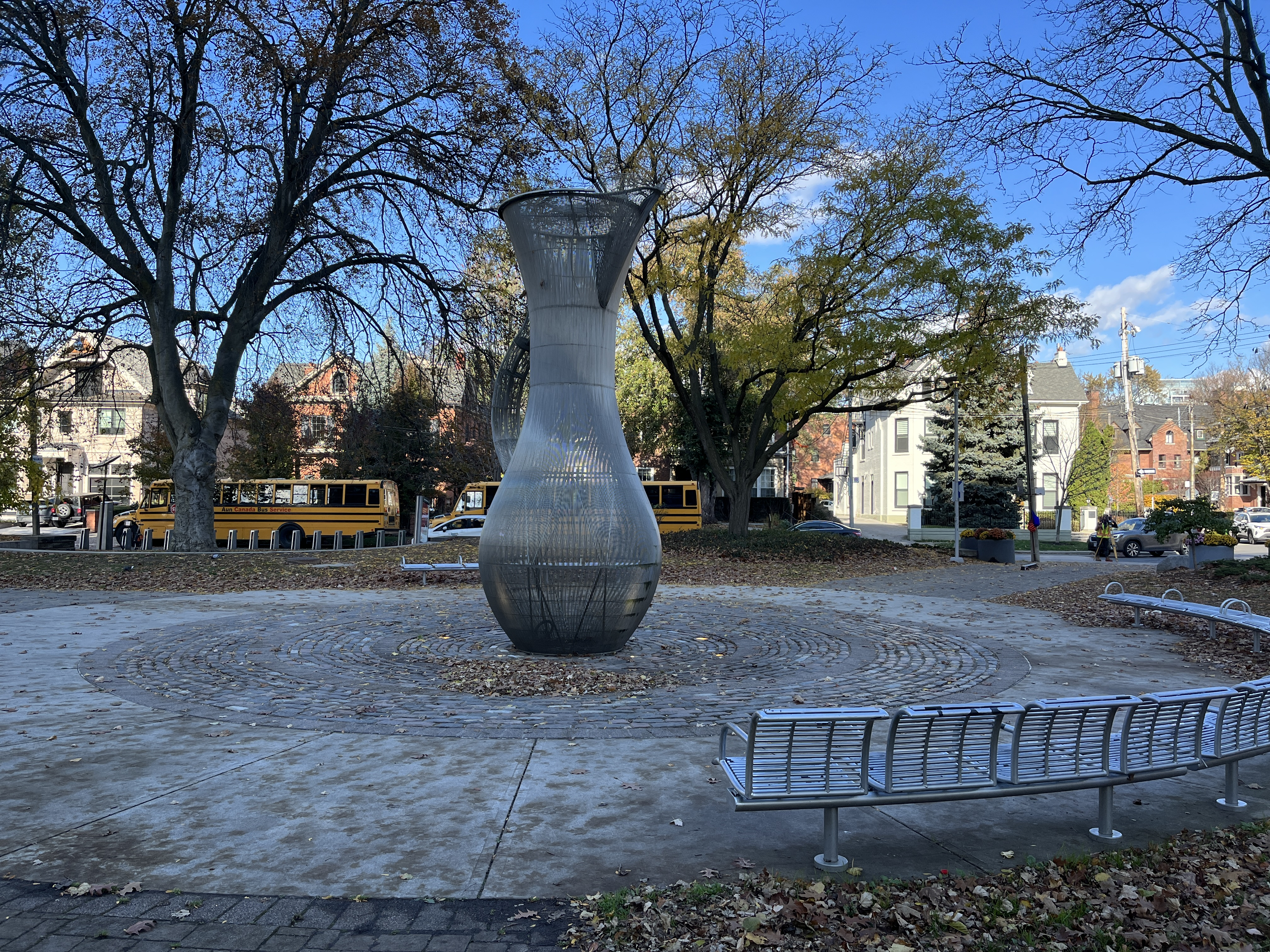
The Vessel by Ilan Sandler, 2023

The park was created in 1976, on what had been the site of the home of Nobel laureate Frederick Banting, and beside the home of Beatrice Worsley (the first female computer scientist in Canada). After extensive renovations, the park reopened in July 2011, with an avant-garde sculpture centrepiece by Ilan Sandler, created from 4 kilometres (2.5 mi) of stainless steel rod, the approximate length of Taddle Creek.

The park has hosted two trees as a memorial to Florence Rosberg. it also has a sculpture by Ilan Sandler called The Vessel, which was installed in 2011.

== See also ==
- List of Toronto parks
