= Barbara Hall Park =

Park in Toronto, Ontario, Canada

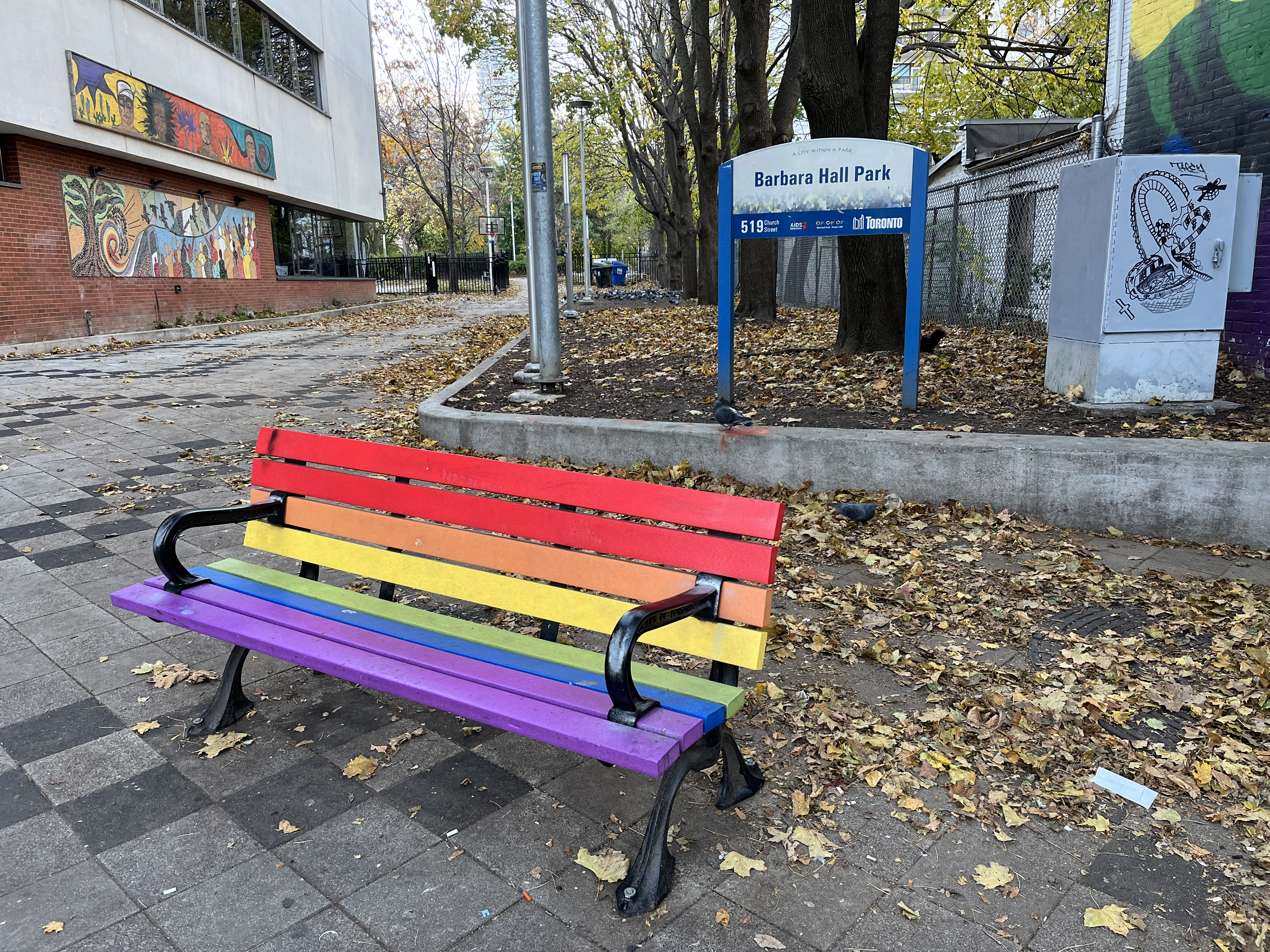
- Part of the park in 2023
- Interactive map of Barbara Hall Park
- Location: Toronto, Ontario, Canada
- Coordinates: 43°40′0″N 79°22′50″W

Barbara Hall Park (formerly Cawthra Square Park) is a park in Toronto, Ontario, Canada. The park was renamed to commemorate Barbara Hall in 2014. Hall was the first Mayor of Toronto to march in the Toronto Pride Parade in 1995. An AIDS memorial is installed in the park. The memorial was vandalized in 2023. A trans memorial was installed in the park in 2014.

== Trans memorial ==
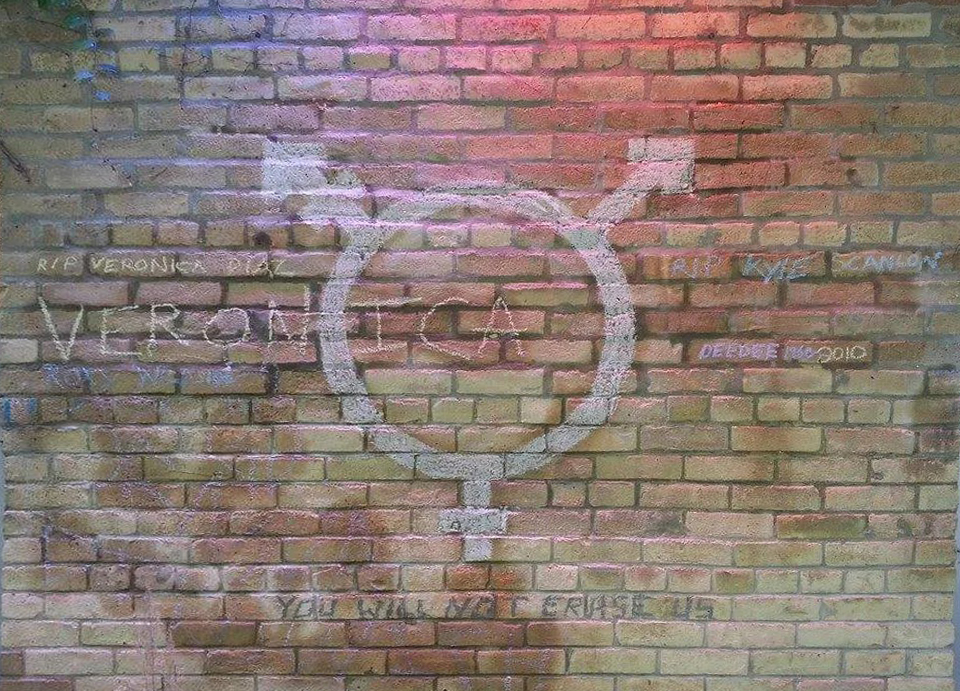
Trans memorial in 2014

A memorial wall for transgender people is located within the park, near the Toronto AIDS memorial. It was originally created as a temporary chalk memorial by local trans women on July 10, 2014. Inspired by the recent passing of a trans community member, the memorial was envisioned as a place where trans people and their lived names could be honoured and remembered.

Shortly after the installation of the trans memorial, and in preparation for the official renaming ceremony, clean-up crews removed the memorial from the wall. Toronto Centre MPP Kristyn Wong-Tam apologized for the removal, and the memorial was immediately restored. Following the official ceremony, Barbara Hall, a human rights advocate and long-time ally of trans people met with community members to pay her respects.

Since then, despite a subsequent erasure and restoration of the memorial in 2017, the park has acted as a community hub for vigils, Trans Day of Remembrance events, and a focal point for trans advocacy.

== Redesign ==
Recognizing the cultural significance of the park as a gathering space for the LGBTQ community, and the need to honour the park's memorials, the City of Toronto invested in a major redesign beginning in 2023. Staged improvements began in 2025 and are expected to be fully completed by 2027.

== See also ==
- Archivo de la Memoria Trans
- Chosen family
- Deadnaming
- List of LGBTQ monuments and memorials
- List of parks in Toronto
- Transgender Memorial Garden
