= Olympic Park (Toronto) =

Park in Toronto, Ontario, Canada

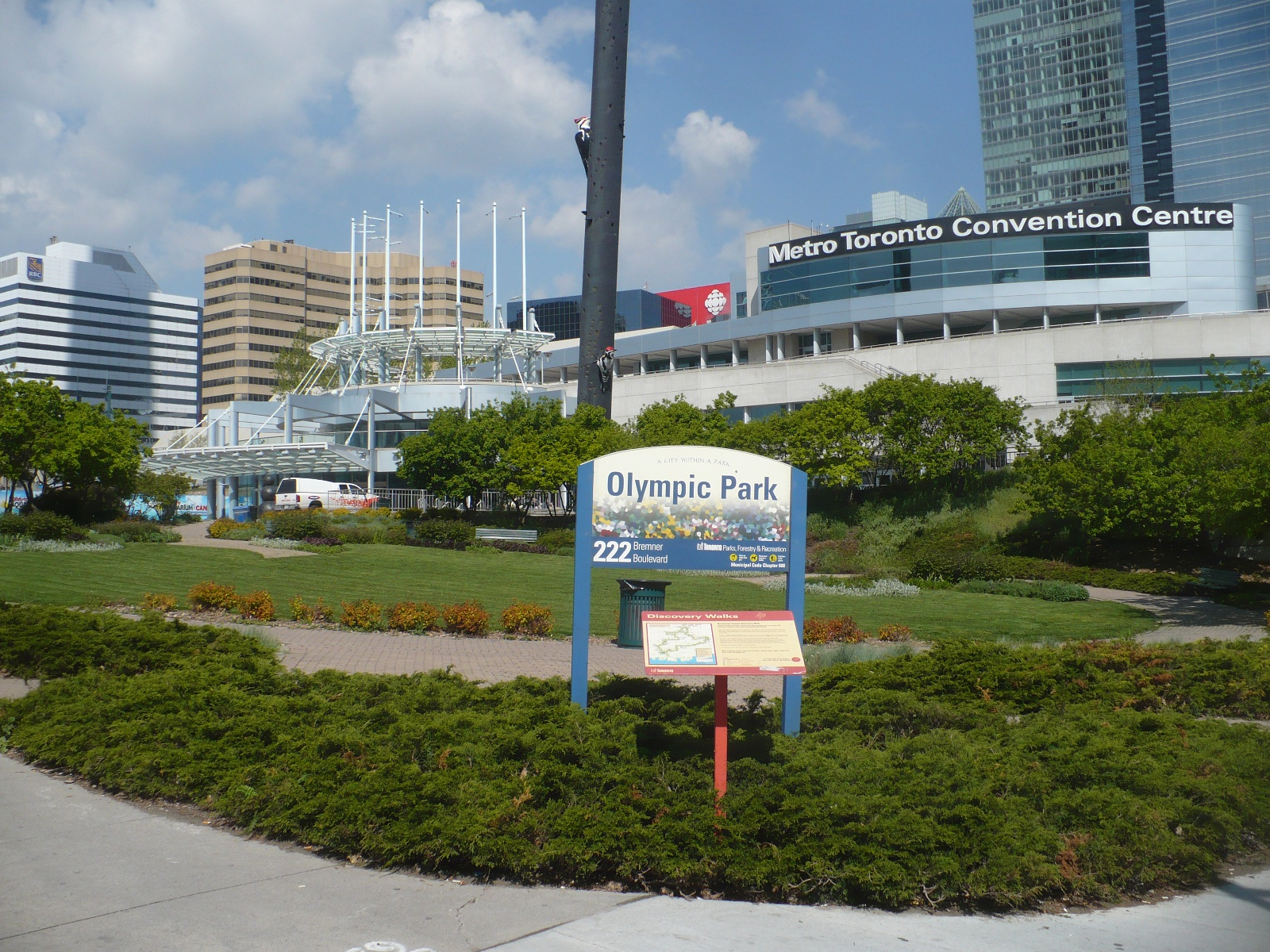
- The park in 2012
- Interactive map of Olympic Park
- Location: Toronto, Ontario, Canada
- Coordinates: 43°38′33″N 79°23′05″W

Olympic Park is a park by Toronto's Metro Toronto Convention Centre, in Ontario, Canada. Located at York Street and Lake Shore Boulevard West, the park has a ring of brick pavers engraved with names.
