= Little Norway Park =

Park in Toronto, Canada

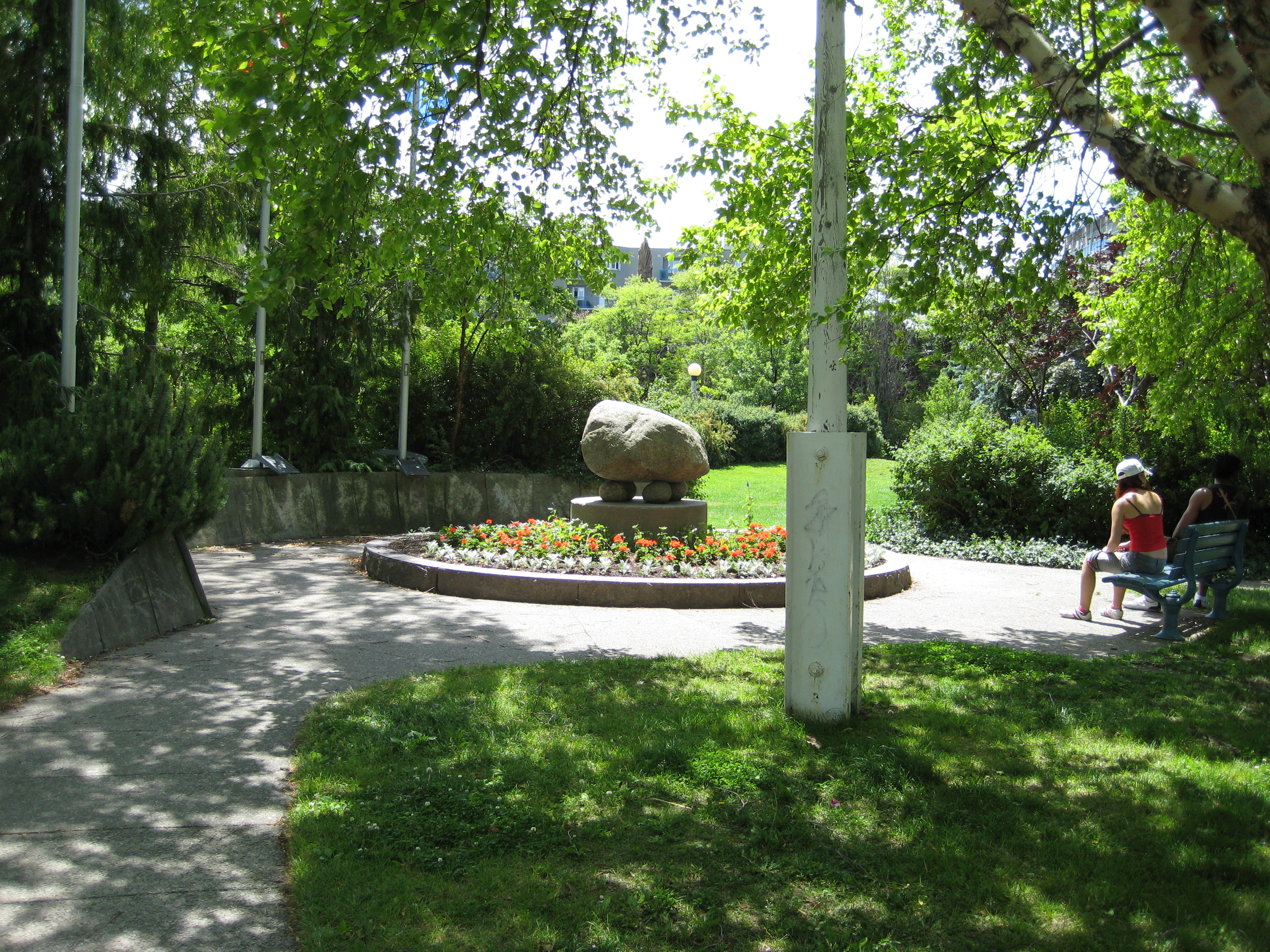

- Location within Toronto
- Type: Public Park
- Location: Toronto, Ontario, Canada
- Coordinates: 43°38′04″N 79°23′54″W
- Area: 2.36 ha (5.8 acres)
- Created: 1986
- Operator: Toronto Parks
- Website: Little Norway Park

Little Norway Park is a small park in the Harbourfront area of Toronto, Ontario, Canada, at the southwest corner of Bathurst Street and Queens Quay West. The park is just north of the Western Channel into Toronto Harbour. It was opened in 1986.

In 2026, the Province of Ontario announced intention to expropriate one-third of the park, in relation to its planned legislation to remove the City's stake in Billy Bishop Toronto City Airport.

== History ==
The park's name commemorates Little Norway, the exiled Royal Norwegian Air Force training base that had occupied the site during the Second World War. In 1976, a 3,000 pound boulder from Norway was transported to the location as a permanent monument to that time. It was unveiled by Crown Prince Harald of Norway on September 18, 1976. The base's location was cleared and, in the 1980s, an apartment complex was built along the western side. The rest of the former base was converted into a park and opened in 1986. The park was officially dedicated as Little Norway Park on November 20, 1987, in a ceremony with King Olav V of Norway.

== Operations ==
Park facilities include a baseball diamond and soccer pitch, a playground and wading pool, public washrooms, landscaped gardens and art installations. It also has a wheelchair-accessible children's playground in its northwest corner. There is a totem pole in the park near Queens Quay West. A flagpole has a plaque at its base explaining the significance of the park and its history.

The park is also a meeting and protest site in downtown Toronto. In 2007, Indigenous peoples gathered at Little Norway Park to protest about broken treaties.

City plans to create an "off-leash" area or dog park there in 2009 created some controversy, with residents complaining of the lack of notice or consultation and the proximity to children playing, and pointing out that there is another dog park 400 metres away.

In April 2026, the Ontario government announced plans to expropriate one-third of the park. Ontario Transportation Minister Prabmeet Sarkaria said that the land was needed for a planned expansion of the neighbouring Billy Bishop Toronto City Airport. On April 23, City Council passed a motion to contest the Province's decision, including considering legal action. A number of other properties on the Toronto Islands have also been marked as potentially of interest for the expansion.
