= Pine Point Park =

Park in Toronto, Ontario, Canada

Coordinates: 43.713773°N 79.539292°W

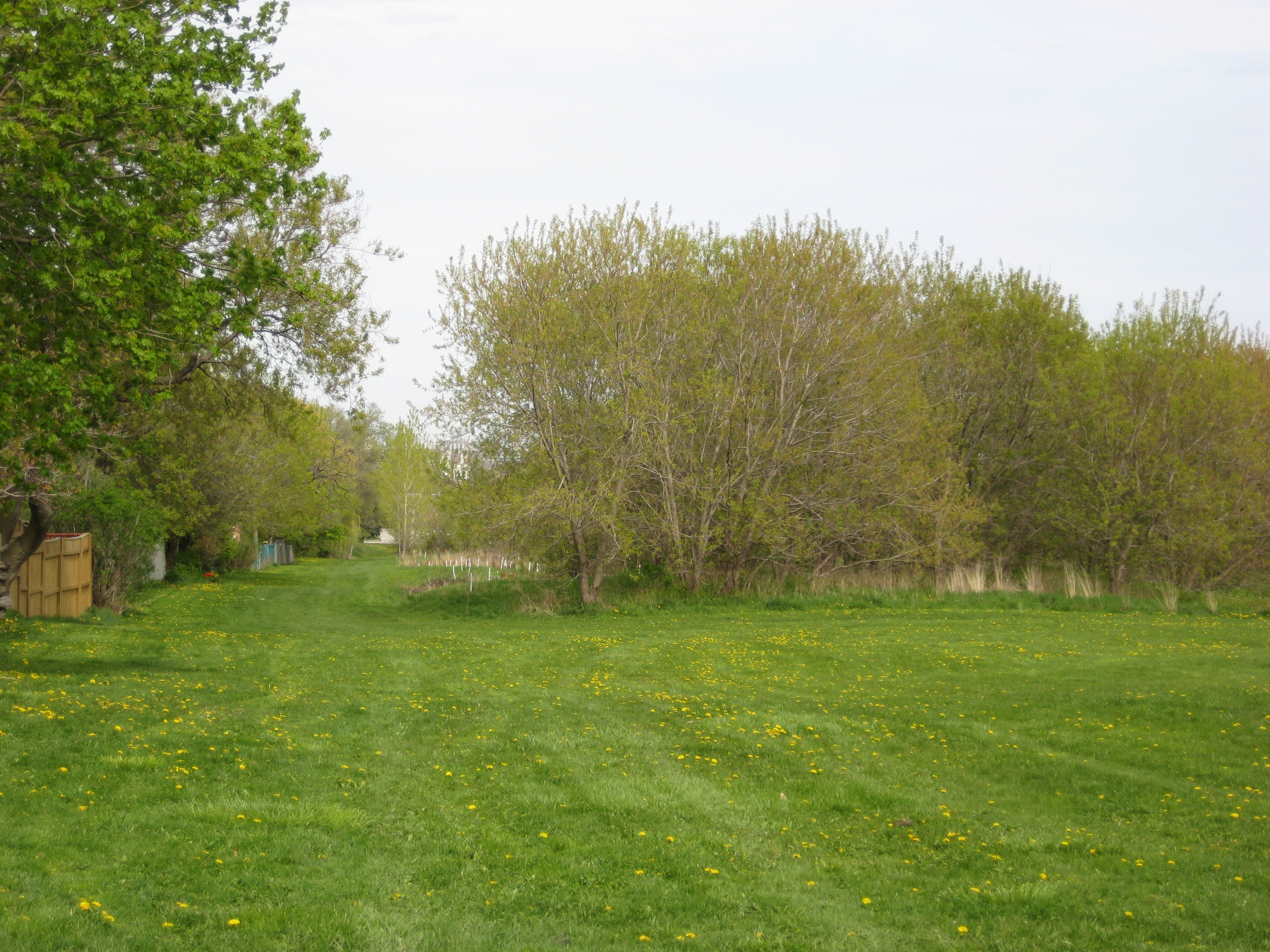
- Interactive map of Pine Point Park
- Type: Public Park
- Location: Toronto, Ontario
- Operator: City of Toronto

Pine Point Park is a park in Toronto, Ontario, Canada, located on the east end junction of Allenby Avenue and Hadrian Drive, near the intersection of Highway 401 and Islington Avenue. The park itself is bordered by Albion Road to the west, Highway 401 to the south, and Humber River to the east.

Pine Point Park was home to the Rexdale Streethawks ball hockey team. The team practiced regularly in the park in an old lacrosse practice facility known locally as "The Box". The team formed in 1989 and disbanded in 1991. Other features in the park include an outdoor swimming pool, four tennis courts, an indoor ice arena that is home to the Etobicoke Hockey League, and a banquet hall that serves the community.
