= Toronto Inukshuk Park =

Park in Toronto, Ontario, Canada

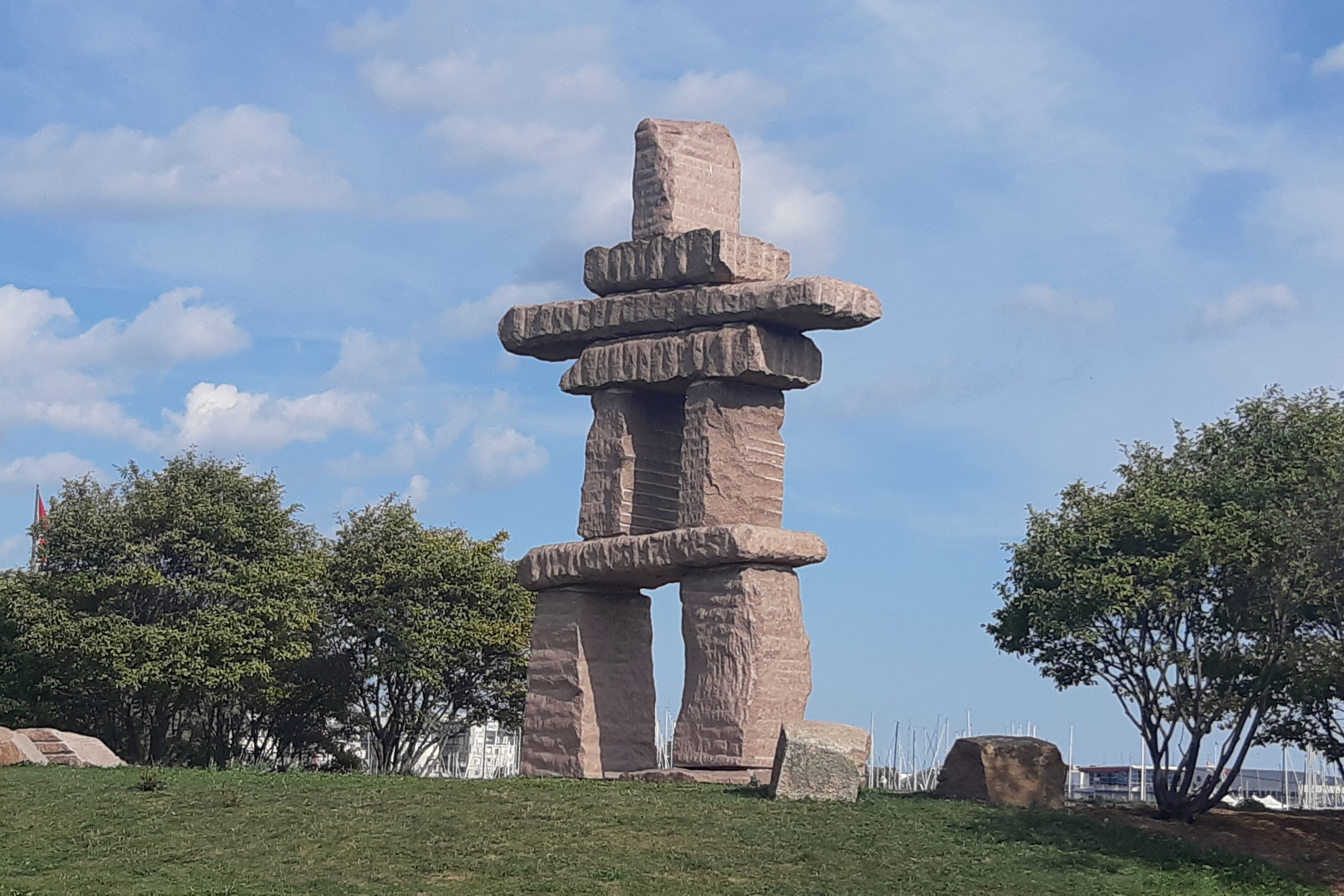
- The park in 2022
- Interactive map of Toronto Inukshuk Park
- Location: Toronto, Ontario, Canada
- Coordinates: 43°37′56″N 79°24′33″W

Toronto Inukshuk Park is a park in Toronto, Ontario, Canada.
