= Raymore =

Raymore may refer to:

== Places ==
Canada

- Raymore, Saskatchewan, a town
- Raymore Drive in Toronto, partly washed out by flooding during Hurricane Hazel (1954)

United States

- Raymore, Missouri, a city
- Raymore, Wisconsin, an unincorporated community

== See also ==
- Ramore, a community in the Canadian province of Ontario
