= Effects of Hurricane Hazel in Canada =

Hurricane Hazel
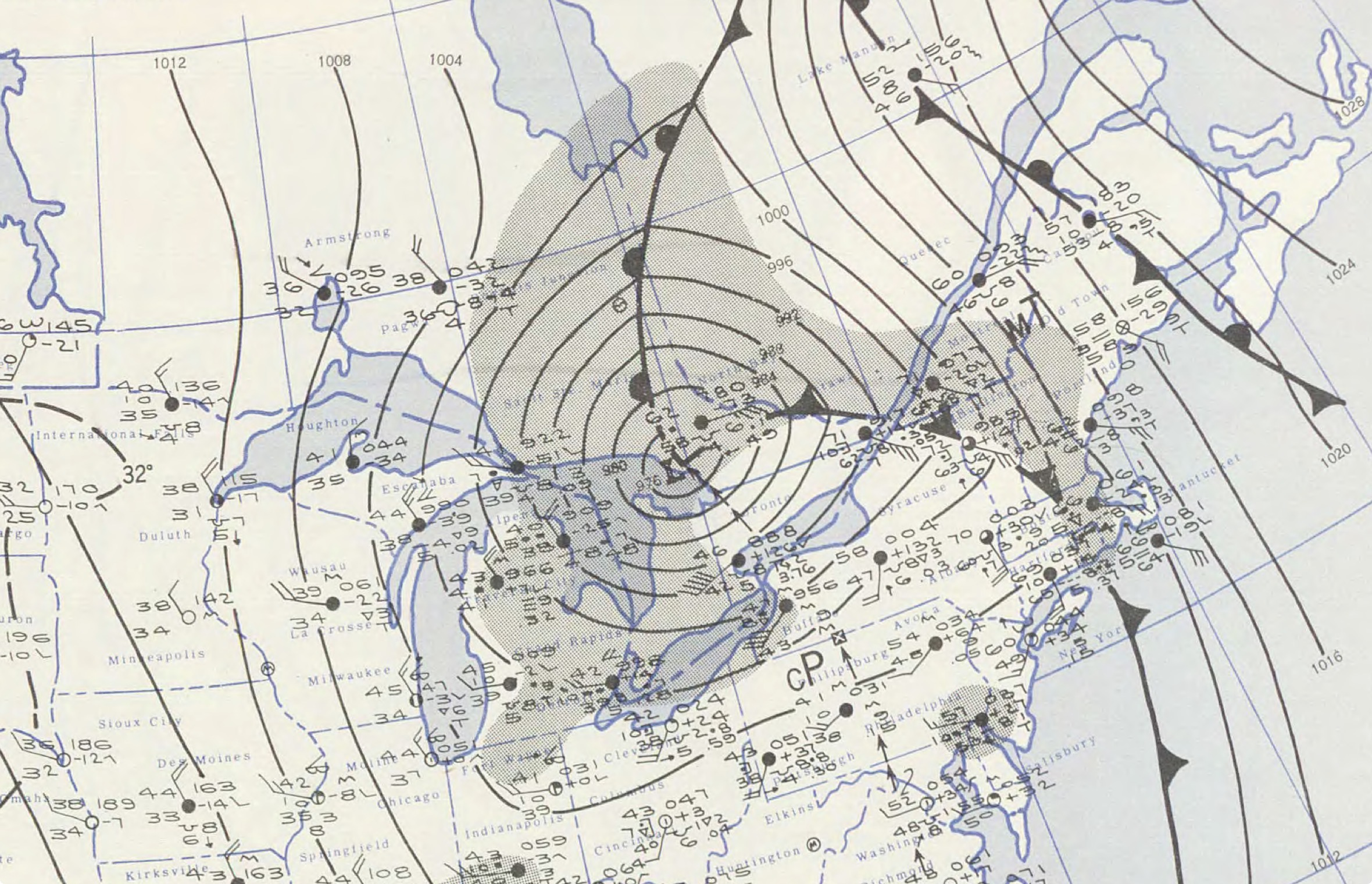
- Weather map of the extratropical remnants of Hazel over Ontario Canada on October 16

Meteorological history
- Duration: October 15–18, 1954

Category 1 hurricane
- 1-minute sustained (SSHWS/NWS)
- Highest winds: 75 mph (120 km/h)

Overall effects
- Fatalities: 81
- Damage: $125 million (1954 USD)
- Areas affected: Ontario (especially Toronto)
- Part of the 1954 Atlantic hurricane season

Canada was severely impacted by Hurricane Hazel, which included 81 deaths and C$137,552,400 ($1,597,351,461.97 in 2025) in damages. Hazel, the deadliest and costliest storm of the 1954 Atlantic hurricane season, reached Toronto, Ontario by the evening of October 15, 1954. It peaked as a category 4 storm, but by the time it had reached Canada, it was an extratropical category 1 storm after merging with an existing cold front south of Ontario. An area of high pressure to the north east caused Hazel to stall over Toronto and to lose most of its moisture.

The worst-affected areas were communities near the Humber River, Holland Marsh, and Etobicoke Creek. Prone to flooding, the Humber River raced downstream from Woodbridge when an earthen dam failed. In the weeks prior to Hazel, Toronto had received copious amounts of rain, and the soil could not hold as much as 200 mm (7.9 in) of rain; consequently, over 90% of it went into Toronto's waterways. The Humber heavily flooded Weston, and killed 35 people in Raymore Drive. Holland Marsh was severely flooded; while no one was killed, the economic losses were severe, as the region's crops were harvested but not collected. In the neighbourhood of Long Branch, the Etobicoke Creek killed seven people and swept numerous dwellings into Lake Ontario. Toronto's infrastructure also took a major hit, with as many as 50 bridges being washed out by the rising waters.

The situation was made worse by the lack of preparedness and awareness. Torontonians did not have prior experience with hurricanes, and the storm as a whole proved to be extremely unpredictable; even the arrival of Hazel came as a surprise. Also, the low-lying areas near the Humber were mostly residential, which were among the worst-affected during the storm. In fact, after Hazel, residential development in areas along Toronto waterways was prohibited, and they became parks instead.

To help with the cleanup, the army was summoned. The destruction in Canada, as well as in the United States and Haiti caused the name Hazel to be retired, and it will never again be used for an Atlantic hurricane. Since the name was retired before the creation of formal lists, it was not replaced with any particular name.

== Background ==
Hurricane Hazel formed on October 5 east of the Lesser Antilles. It entered the Caribbean Sea and intensified, becoming a major hurricane by October 9. After turning abruptly northward, Hazel struck Haiti, killing more than 1,000 people. The hurricane then turned back to the northwest and accelerated. On October 14, just before reaching Carolinas, hurricane hunter planes found the hurricane's winds to have accelerated to 240 kilometres per hour (150 mph), which made it a Category 4 storm, and moving at a high forward speed of 48 kilometres per hour (30 mph). The storm made landfall near the North Carolina/South Carolina border by the morning on October 15. Hazel quickly transitioned into an extratropical cyclone as it interacted with a cold front. Hazel accelerated to over 80 km/h (50 mph) upon making landfall, moving over western Pennsylvania and New York State. Against meteorologists' predictions, Hazel had not lost much intensity, with winds nearing 160 km/h (99 mph) in parts of Delaware, Maryland, New York, and Pennsylvania. Before leaving the United States, the storm had claimed 95 lives, most of which were drowning casualties. On October 16, Hazel moved crossed into Ontario, passing near Toronto. After turning to the northeast, into what is today known as the Kativik region of extreme northern Quebec, the remnants of Hazel were absorbed by a larger extratropical storm over Canada on October 18.

== Preparations ==
The hurricane was originally forecast to lose power over the Allegheny Mountains, and two Special Weather Bulletins issued by the Dominion Weather Office expected Toronto to be mostly spared albeit with a caveat that if Hazel merged with an existing cold front south of Ontario, severe weather would result. High winds, between 65 and 80 km/h (40 and 50 mph), with only occasional showers as a result of Hazel were forecast, and in Toronto, the fact that a hurricane was arriving was not mentioned on television or radio stations. Ships on Lakes Erie and Ontario received warnings about strong winds, but the predicted wind speeds ranged from 65 to 120 km/h (40 to 75 mph).

Since the storm was expected to pass east of Toronto, few measures were taken. With few people in Canada having any experience with hurricanes, as storms that went that far inland northwest being virtually unheard of, very few warnings were given, and there were no evacuations prior to the storm, as it was expected that it would pass east of the city. Areas along rivers and creeks were particularly vulnerable to flooding, as homes were built in their floodplains. Toronto Hydro had called in standby crews as heavy winds were forecast, but they were almost sent home at one point because of a lull in the storm.

== Impact ==
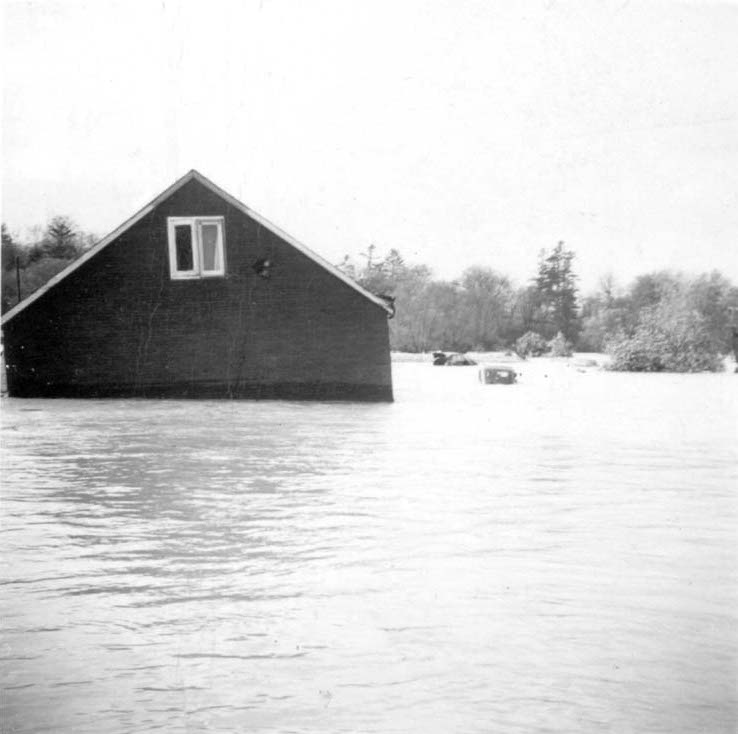
A house submerged in floodwaters during the storm

In the few weeks leading up to Hazel striking the Greater Toronto Area (GTA), the region had received above-average rainfall. When the storm arrived, the water table was already saturated. As a result, most of the precipitation, with estimates going as high as 90%, simply ran off into rivers and creeks in Toronto, which raised water levels by as much as six to eight metres. As a result, anything built in the floodplain of a major waterway was either inundated or simply swept away. In a city not used to heavy flooding, there had been no experience with the natural disasters like hurricanes, which resulted in a lack of preparedness and greater loss of life.

Although all of Southern Ontario received heavy rainfall as a result of Hazel, the Greater Toronto Area, in addition to being particularly vulnerable beforehand, received the most. Snelgrove, Ontario, near Brampton, received the most rain, at 214 mm (8.4 in), and both Snelgrove and Brampton reported 90 millimetres (3.5 in) between 9 p.m. and midnight EDT on October 15. Within the GTA, there was considerable disparity in the amount of rain received, with the west end receiving considerably more than the east end. Areas southeast of Danforth Avenue, which starts immediately east of the Don River, in the east end of the city, reported only 77 mm (3.0 in) that day, with rainfall totals decreasing when going east. On the other hand, Malton Airport (now Lester B. Pearson International Airport), in the west end of the city, reported 137 mm (5.4 in) of rain, with the totals increasing until they were past Brampton.

No natural disaster since has led to such a high death toll, 81 people, in Canada. In addition, over 4,000 families were left homeless. The Department of Public Safety and Emergency Preparedness Canada estimates the total cost of Hurricane Hazel for Canada, taking into account long-term effects such as economic disruption, the cost of lost property, and recovery costs, as being C$137,552,400 (2022: $1,425,646,253.71).

=== Infrastructure ===
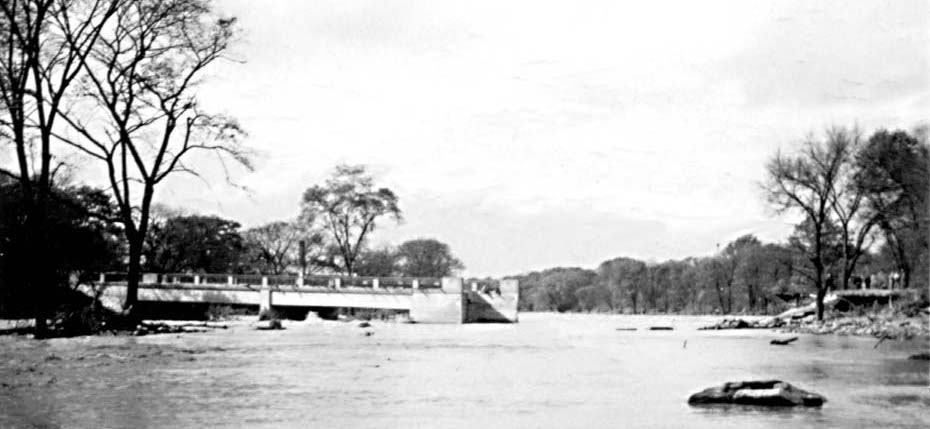
The Lawrence Avenue bridge was washed out by the Humber River; part of it remained attached to the shore, and the rest was swept away by the river.

With river and stream levels rising, Toronto's infrastructure took a heavy hit. Not built to withstand serious flooding, as it is in a climate area that does not see exceptionally prolonged or heavy rainfall, over 50 bridges, many part of important highways, were heavily damaged or put out of commission after high water itself washed them out or debris in the water smashed them. Numerous roads and railways were also washed out.

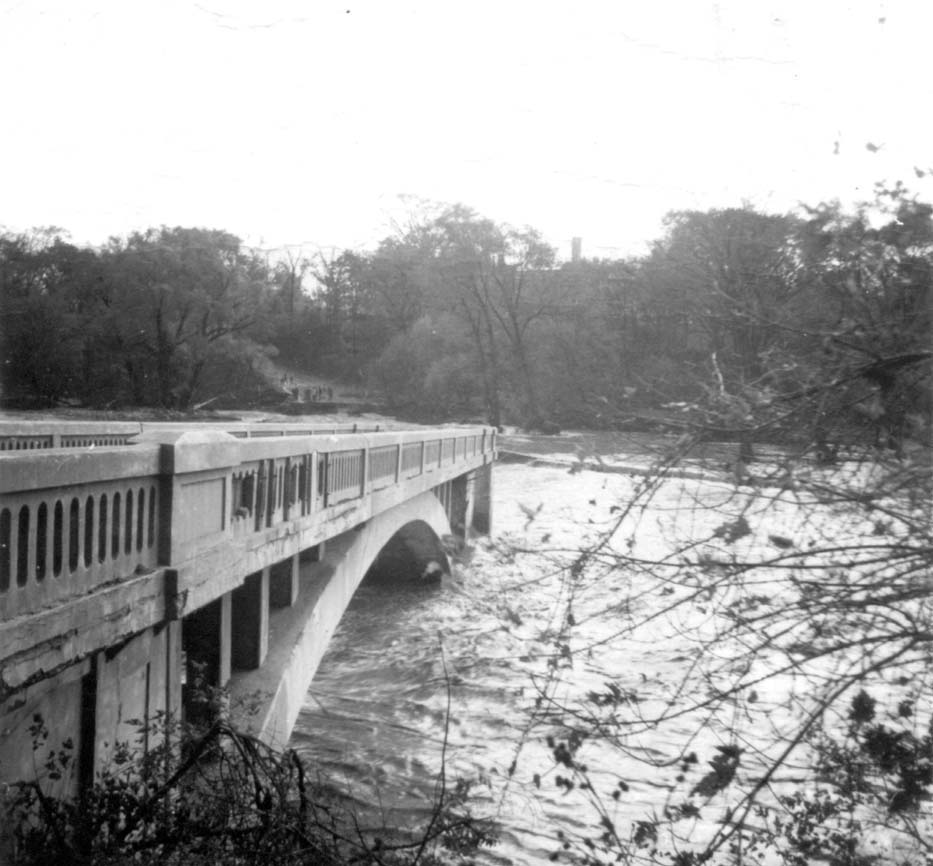
The St. Phillips Road bridge, pictured the day after, was under at least 10 ft (3.0 m) of water at the height of the flood.

Highway 400 was arguably the most-affected road. The highway passes directly through Holland Marsh north of Toronto, where it was under as much as 3 m (9.8 ft) of water in some places when as much 6.1 metres (20 ft) of water backed up from Lake Simcoe. At the Cookstown Cloverleaf, the road was washed out in both directions, which left 350 people stranded at a service station. Finally, between Cookstown and Barrie, three culverts carrying the roads were destroyed. Many other highways were affected by bridge and other structural damages, which included Highways 2, 5, 7, 11, 26, 27, and 49. There were a few fatalities from car crashes; for instance, one person died when his car plunged into a cave-in on Highway 7. Communities affected by bridge washouts included Scarborough (10 entire bridges and six bridge approaches), Markham (11 in their entirety and three approaches), and North York (seven in their entirety). The damage to roads and bridges caused long-term economic and transportation problems. With Hazel arriving relatively close to winter, only temporary fixes could be made, which did not withstand the spring thaw.

Railways were also affected by the rising waters. Passenger trains were disrupted, and there were two fatalities when a train hit a washout near Southampton.

Mariners on Lakes Erie and Ontario heeded warnings and avoided any loss of life. As a result of high waves on Lake Ontario, the National Yacht Club incurred over C$100,000 (2009: over C$800,000) in damage. At the base of Etobicoke Creek, a boathouse incurred over $30,000 (2009: approximately $250,000) in damage, and 25 boats were swept into the lake at Oakville, including the Harbour Master's boat. That boat became a ward of the court after the salvaging company claimed ownership, but the previous owners disagreed and argued that the vessel was not abandoned since it was lost as a result of an "Act of God"

=== Holland Marsh ===
The Holland Marsh, a muck crop farming region, is located in a bowl-shaped valley directly south of Lake Simcoe, near Bradford. Unlike the flash floods in rivers and creeks to the south, the flooding of Holland Marsh was slow, which allowed many people to escape to Bradford, which is located on a hill, and avoid drowning. The nature of the flood caused there to be few casualties, but the flooding itself was severe. In the northern part of the marsh, 1.2 to 6.1 m (four to 20 ft) of water backed up from the lake, and on the opposite end, between 6.1 and 9.0 m (20.0 and 29.5 ft) of water backed up from the Holland River and the Schomberg Creek.

Property damage was particularly severe: Allan Andreson, a CBC reporter, described that the "marsh was just like one vast lake. All you could see in the distance sticking out of the water was the steeple of the Springdale Christian Reformed Church." Highway 400, which bisects the marsh, was under five to ten feet [1.5–3.0 metres] of water. The majority of the properties in the marsh were inundated with water, and homes and their contents were either seriously damaged or destroyed. Many of the houses were contaminated by the flood or the rotting vegetables (the crop was recently harvested) and became unfit for habitation. A few homes were taken off their foundations by the waters and floated around the marsh. One, the DePeuter residence, which contained the parents, 12 children and a cat, spent the night floating on the marsh for 3.2 km (2.0 mi). As a result of the flooding, 3,000 people were left homeless as 28.35 km^{2} (7,010 acres) of the marsh became a lake.

Like the property losses, the economic ones were also hard. While most of the year's crop had been harvested by mid-October, it had not been brought in was either submerged or swept away by the flood. It is estimated that more than 500 000 bags of onions, a similar amount of celery, and millions of bushels of other crops were taken by the flood, and were left to rot in the water. No one died at Holland Marsh, but total damage was up to $10,000,000 (2009: $81,600,000).

=== Humber River ===
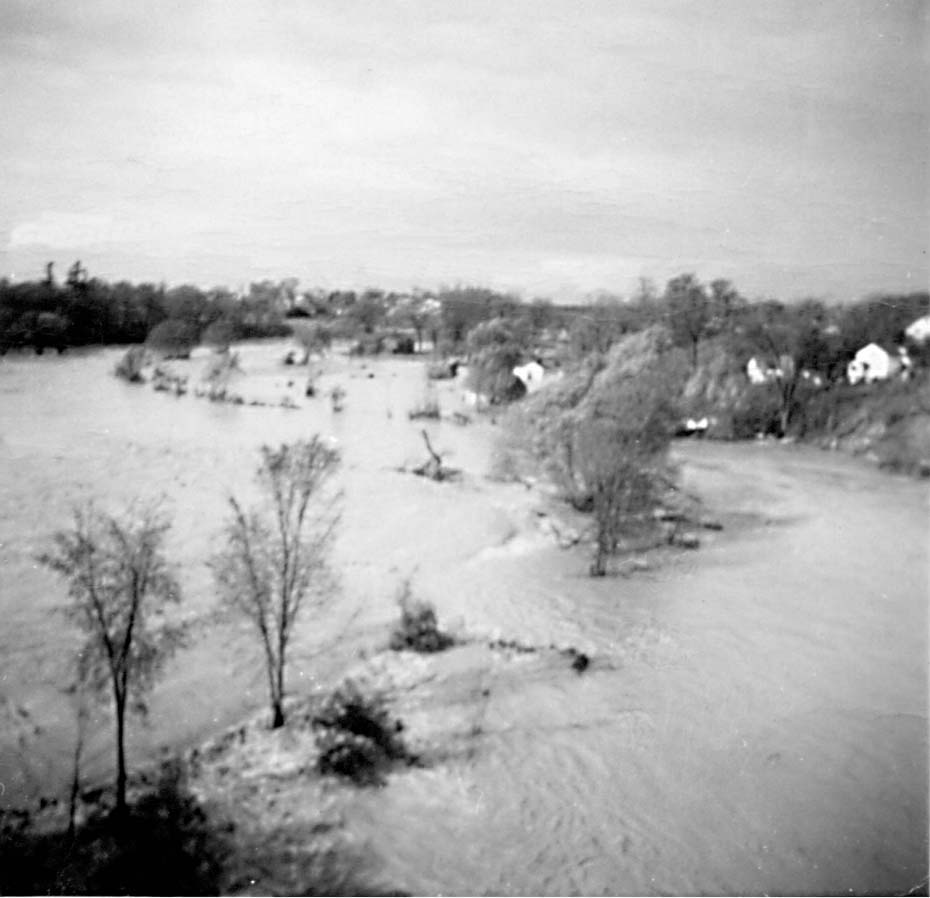
The Weston Golf Club was left submerged after the Humber River burst its banks during Hurricane Hazel.

The Humber River, in the west end of the city, caused the most destruction as a result of an intense flash flood. Located in a glacial trench, the river in some areas occupies the full width of the trench, but in other areas, most of the trench is a floodplain, which was heavily urbanized and deforested at the time. Some sort of flood control had been proposed for the Humber River, but none existed, and with most of the rains running off directly into the river, a flash flood ensued, which was especially exacerbated by the steepness of the river.

The resulting current was so strong that the Toronto Star reported that the police were informed that no boat should be launched in the river and said that "nothing can make it and anyone in it will be killed for sure." That prediction came true when a team of five volunteer firefighters was killed when its fire truck was swept away while it was responding to help a stranded motorist.

==== Woodbridge ====
Woodbridge, northwest of Toronto, was the first community to be hit by rising waters. The Humber swelled from its usual width of 20 to 107 m (66 to 351 ft) at its narrowest point. An earthen dam collapsed, which sent water gushing into a trailer park. Nine people died, and hundreds were left homeless. Outside the trailer park, the community's infrastructure was affected, with sidewalks being uprooted and sewage and water mains being broken. The floodwater that was released at Woodbridge went down the river, which caused further destruction to communities downstream.

==== Weston and environs ====
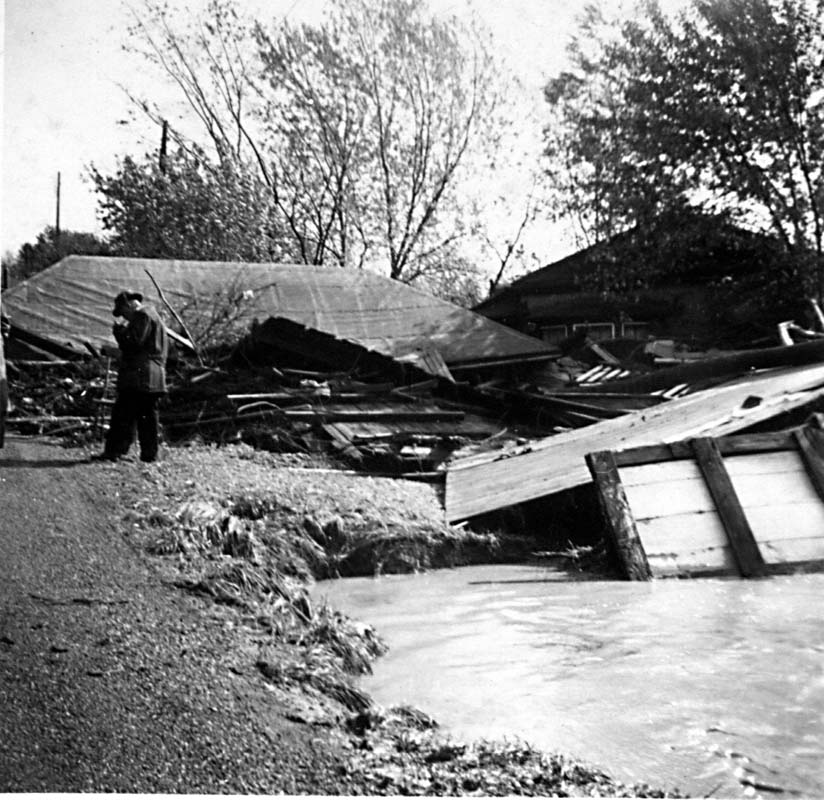
A house destroyed by Hurricane Hazel, slightly north of Weston

Weston, now a neighbourhood of Toronto, was a town on the east bank of the Humber River. Susceptible to flooding, it and other smaller communities near it suffered the worst floods in Toronto.

Jim Crawford, a policeman aged 23, and Herb Jones, a contractor, were credited with saving as many as 50 lives between the start of the heavy flooding during the late evening until daybreak. Crawford supplied gas for Jones' boat, and they set out into the river, which flooded as high as the telephone wires. Rescuing people from their porches, second-floor windows, or roofs, Crawford described that he and Jones had bounced around like a cork and dodged debris, houses, and telephone poles.

South of Weston, the community of Mount Dennis suffered extremely high floodwaters. Homes were surrounded by water as much as 3 m (9.8 ft) deep on Cynthia Avenue. As a result of erosion caused by the floodwaters, properties ended up bordering cliffs. Black Creek, normally narrow enough for a person to be able to jump over it and at most 30 cm (0.98 ft) deep, swelled to flood three streets.

==== Raymore Drive ====
Raymore Drive was a mostly-residential street near Weston on the opposite bank and was home to a mix of blue-collar workers and retirees. As a result of the heavy rainfall, the level of the nearby Humber River slowly rose. As the water rose, a footbridge spanning the Humber near the street was torn off one abutment and redirected the Humber right through the low-lying neighbourhood. The water rose by over 6 metres (20 ft) in a flood that suddenly became much more violent, and after some time, the bridge itself was seized by the Humber's waters and became akin to a battering ram, which caused even more destruction to properties.

Entire homes were swept away by the water, aided in part by the severed bridge. As a result of the massive flood, 366 m (1,201 ft), 39% of the 922 m road as well as 14 homes, many with their occupants inside, were simply swept away by the Humber. Because of the powerful torrent gushing down the Humber, many victims' bodies were never recovered. The worst-hit home was located at 148 Raymore Drive, which was shared by the Edwards and Neil family. Nine inhabitants died, three adults and six children; the bodies of two-year-old Frank and three-month-old John Edwards were never recovered.

The rise of the river was unprecedented, and many residents did not evacuate, which led to 35 casualties. The Army was called in to assist in the cleanup. The flood damage was so severe that the area that was flooded along Raymore Drive ceased to be a residential area and became a park. In contrast, some homes on the street that were a little higher and farther away merely received a little water in the basement.

=== Long Branch ===
The neighbourhood of Long Branch, now part of the City of Toronto, is bounded by Lake Ontario to the south and by the Etobicoke Creek to the west. During the storm, the creek overflowed its banks, completely flooded three streets near the lake, and caused very heavy damage to others. As the water rose, 4 people were evacuated from a trailer park; sometime later during the night, trailers as long as 12.2 m (40 ft) in length were seized by the creek and became battering rams against other buildings in the area.

In addition to the trailers being swept away by the torrent, many houses, with people still in or on top of them, were swept into Lake Ontario. Many people were saved when the houses in which they took shelter were stopped by trees from going into the lake. The reeve, Marie Curtis, was quoted in The Globe and Mail saying that if it were not for the trees, half of the village would have been swept into the lake. She also described a house with 35 people on its roof that was stopped by two trees from floating into the lake.

After three floods in five years, the 192 properties were expropriated and the area was made into a park. That measure was taken for two reasons: there was an inherent risk of a similar catastrophic flood since a heavier death toll avoided by a stroke of luck, and as a result of flood erosion, a sanitary sewer that had run 2.1 m (6.9 ft) below the riverbed now ran only 0.9 m (3.0 ft) below. Of the 192 properties that were expropriated, 43 were totally destroyed, 68 were seriously damaged, 37 were slightly damaged, 30 garages were destroyed, and one store was seriously damaged.

Seven people were killed. Many houses were trapped by trees and not swept into the lake. That and the effective rescue measures caused most flood victims to be saved. The area is now Marie Curtis Park, which is named after the reeve at the time of the disaster.

=== Don River ===
In the east side of Toronto, areas near Don River received some flooding, although the situation was less severe because of the substantially smaller amount of rainfall. Since most of the rain still went into the river, the level of the water rose substantially, and there was some flooding. However, compared to the Humber or Etobicoke Creek, there was relatively little property damage, and no loss of life was reported.

=== Areas outside Greater Toronto Area ===
With Hazel striking Canada directly at Toronto (it was in fact directly over Downtown Toronto at one point), the Greater Toronto Area suffered the heaviest damages, and nearly all the fatalities were concentrated there. However, other communities were also affected by Hazel.

Directly north of Toronto, the town of Barrie was flooded, which damaged some roads and sewers. In Beeton, five people, in two cars, were killed when they were washed off a bridge. In Ottawa, a fence at Lansdowne Park was blown over; with the Rough Riders scheduled to play the Toronto Argonauts, officials were worried that many fans would get in for free, as the hole in the fence could not be fixed in time. Across the Ottawa River, a man from Hull, Quebec, was electrocuted while he was trying to move a tree that was felled by the storm, which downed a power line. As Hazel passed over James Bay, the area near Moosonee reported heavy winds and snowfall.

== Aftermath ==
As a result of the catastrophic damage and severe death tolls in the Caribbean, United States and Canada, the name Hazel was retired and will never again be used for an Atlantic tropical cyclone. Since the name was retired before the creation of formal lists, it was not replaced with any particular name.

=== Cleanup ===
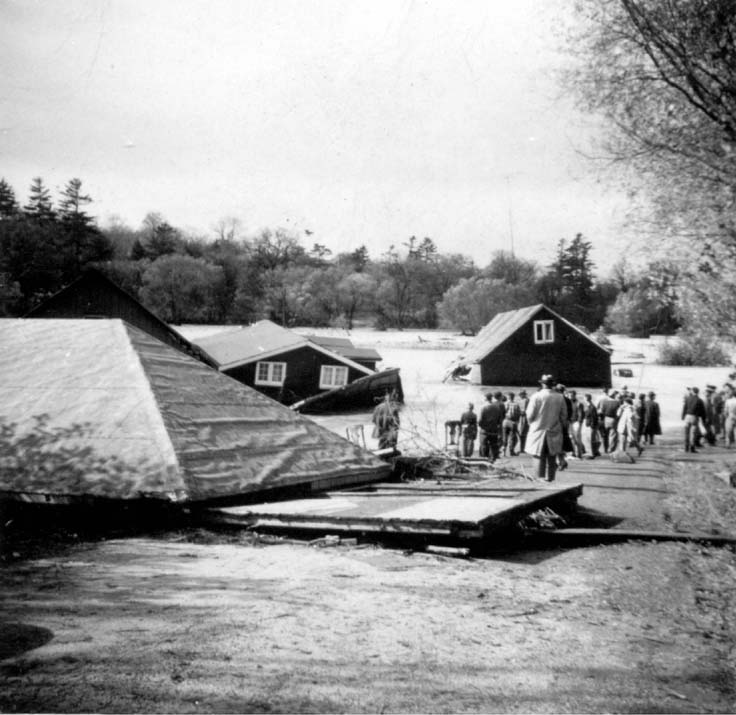
Damage as a result of Hazel was already being assessed the following morning.

Eight hundred troops (fifteen militia groups and eight army reserve units) were summoned to Toronto to assist with the cleanup. Local members of the navy assisted by providing boats and 100 men. The army donated 900 blankets, 350 mattresses, 175 double decker beds, and 150 stretchers in the relief effort. Tools such as bulldozers, crowbars, and pike poles were used to search for bodies. The length of time for which the militia, which as composed of civilians, could help was limited, as their employers could not afford to keep paying them during their absence. Most stayed for two weeks, and others continued to volunteer during their time off.

Torontonians as a whole collectively helped out with the relief effort. The Salvation Army received so many donations, of clothes, footwear, blankets, food, and money that its storage facilities were overfilled. As a result, it had to request that no more donations were needed, with assurances that they will be accepted when the need would arise. The Salvation Army also provided 100 volunteers. The Boy Scouts patrolled Etobicoke for looters, and their British counterparts donated to them 454 kg (1,001 lb) of supplies. The Red Cross sent rescuers to Long Branch and sheltered 90 people in Port Credit and 30 in Lambin. It provided supplies and shelter to 300 residents of Holland Marsh who had evacuated to Bradford. Nurses gave typhoid shots in Woodbridge, and Toronto provided them with water. The city also placed heavy machinery such as bulldozers, shovel loaders, and trucks to assist in the cleanup at any community's disposal.

=== Financial relief ===
Governments made major financial contributions to the relief effort. Toronto City Council donated $50,000 (2009: $407,000), which was criticised as too little. Metropolitan Toronto proposed to donate $100,000 (2009: $813,000) separately, but the special legislation required for that donation caused the total amount that was donated to be $112,000 (2009: $911,000), with the City paying 62%. A councillor also estimated that with the other contributions of men and equipment, the total value of donations was $500,000 (2009: $4,100,000), which was a popular alternate proposal for the financial donation within the council. The federal government donated $1,000,000 (2009: $8,100,000), which matched the provincial donation.

The Hurricane Relief Fund (HRF) was established to "receive contributions from all those citizens in this province and elsewhere who desire to assist those who have lost so much." The HRF received donations from a variety of sources. The neighbouring city of Hamilton donated $20,000 (2009: $163,000). Pope Pius XII "sent his 'deepest sympathy'" and gave $10,000 (2009: $81,000). The Ford Motor Company donated $25,000 (2009: $203,000), Laura Secord Candy Shops gave $1000 (2009: $8,100), and the British American Oil Company donated $20,000 (2009: $163,000). The Atkinson Charitable Foundation gave $250,000 (2009: $2,000,000), and the United Church of Canada donated $5000 (2009: $41,000). Approximately $5,100,000 (2009: $41,80,000) was distributed from a total fund of about $5,300,000 (2009: $43,000,000), with half the remainder set aside as a contingency reserve in the event of unresolved claims and the other half being used up by administration expenses.

Insurance companies set up offices in New Toronto, Woodbridge, and Newmarket to handle the claims in the wake of Hazel. Previous flooding caused many to find out that damage as a result of flooding was not covered. However, in some cases, if wind broke a window during the storm, partial reimbursement could be obtained for water damage by the logic that some water would enter the dwelling through the window.

=== Conservation ===
The residential area on Raymore Drive that was destroyed by the flood was not rebuilt and was made into Raymore Park.

In the aftermath of Hurricane Hazel, the Toronto and Region Conservation Authority was created by the merger of smaller regional conservation authorities, with the mission to manage the area's floodplains and rivers. For instance, there had been rejected plans to build dams along the Humber River to control flooding. After the storm, some were built, but they would not prevent flooding in another weather event with Hazel's intensity and the same mitigating circumstances. Other than making changes in the Greater Toronto Area, flood control in Ontario and the rest of Canada became a more important issue.

Land in heavily flooded areas was expropriated, and policies were instituted to prevent home construction and other development projects in ravines or floodplains. Most of the expropriated land was turned into parkland. The expropriation proved controversial, especially over the financial compensation given to home owners. According to the Ontario Mobile Home Association, owners of trailers were compensated substantially less proportional to house owners. Between Dundas Street and Lake Ontario, the Humber River is parkland, and what was Raymore Drive at the time of the storm was turned into Raymore Park, which contains a footbridge over the Humber dedicated to the victims. Flood controls were instituted along the flooded waterways; downstream from Raymore Drive, a weir was built, and a retaining wall was built on the eastern bank of the Humber opposite the eastern end of the street.

== See also ==
- List of Canadian hurricanes
- List of retired Atlantic hurricane names
- History of Toronto
- Geography and climate of Toronto
