= Raymore Drive =

Minor street in Toronto, Ontario, Canada

Coordinates: 43°41′47.94″N 79°30′54.24″W

- Interactive map of Raymore Drive
- Maintained by: the City of Toronto government
- Length: 0.563 km (0.350 mi); Was formerly 0.929 km (0.577 mi), before it was washed away during Hurricane Hazel
- West end: Scarlett Road in Toronto
- East end: Raymore Park in Toronto

Raymore Drive is a mostly residential street in the Weston neighbourhood of Toronto in the Canadian province of Ontario. It runs next to the Humber River. On October 15, 1954, the area was severely affected by Hurricane Hazel. When the Humber River burst its banks and tore away a footbridge, the waters of the Humber were redirected through the neighbourhood. The flood killed 35 residents and washed away 39 percent of the street. The washed-away part of Raymore Drive was never rebuilt, as subsequent residential development in that area has been prohibited; it is now part of Raymore Park.

All together, Hazel was responsible for 81 deaths in Canada.

== Early history ==
Raymore Drive and Raymore Park are located on land which was owned by the Scarlett family, the namesake for Scarlett Road, until the mid-1850s. In 1857, Rowland Burr, a local businessman, proposed to build a canal between Lake Ontario and Georgian Bay on Lake Huron, which would have used part of the Humber River where it passes Raymore Drive. This project was not completed, and instead the Trent Canal, which links Lake Huron at Severn to Lake Ontario at Trenton, roughly 150 km (93 mi) to the northeast, was built to serve the purpose.

The area instead became residential, and by the mid-1950s, Raymore Drive was home to a mix of retirees and blue-collar workers. Near the intersection of Raymore Drive and Gilhaven Avenue, a footbridge was built over the Humber to facilitate travel to Weston's main commercial area. At the time, Raymore Drive went from Scarlett Road, mostly along the Humber River, passing Brownlea Avenue, Waterton Road, Tilden Crescent, and Gilhaven Avenue. Raymore continued to follow the Humber on its right bank, and curved back to end at Gilhaven. Before the street curved south, only the south side of Raymore Drive had houses, while when the streets went north to south, homes lined both sides of the street.

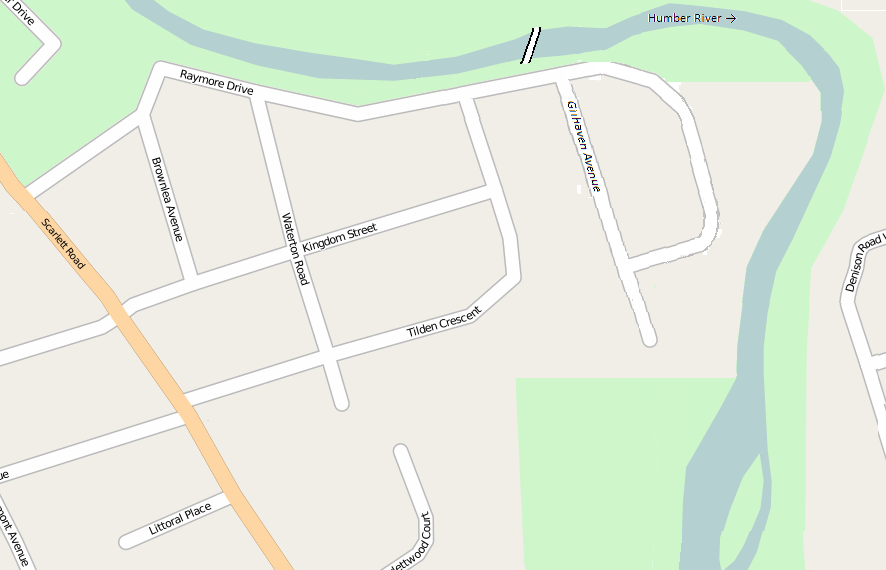
Raymore Drive, 1953

== Hurricane Hazel ==
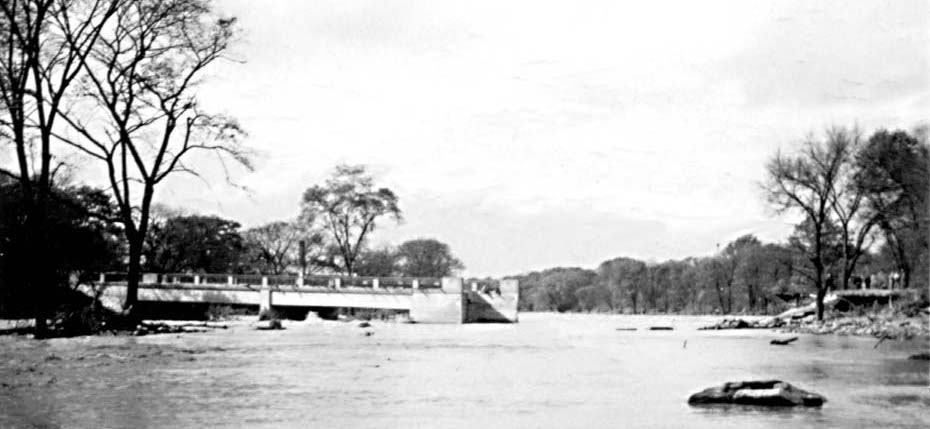
Not far upstream, the Lawrence Avenue bridge was washed away by the Humber River; part of it remained attached to the shore, while the rest was swept away by the river.

Hurricane Hazel was a powerful hurricane which gained strength in the Caribbean Sea and made landfall near the Carolinas' border in the United States. Defying meteorologists' prediction, the storm quickly travelled north towards Canada, and merged with a cold front around Pennsylvania. Hazel lost its tropical characteristics, but, contrary to the predictions again, it did not lose its strength.

When it arrived in Toronto on October 15, 1954, the situation was exacerbated by a multitude of factors. Firstly, the region had received above-average rainfall, with more than six weeks' worth received in the previous 16 days. As a result, the water table was saturated and as much as 90 percent of up to 200 mm (7.9 in) of the storm rainfall went directly into the waterways, such as the Humber River. Secondly, Raymore Drive and the rest of the neighbourhood were partially located in the floodplain of the Humber River and were consequently very vulnerable if the water level rose substantially. Finally, Torontonians were not familiar with hurricanes nor heavy flooding, which led to complacency or confusion. In one case, a long-time resident believed that the water would not rise high enough to endanger lives, which led others to stay, despite warnings to the contrary from the many other residents. Some later waded through cold nose-deep waters to alert and rescue neighbours.

The narrow Humber River became overfull, and water could not be contained at Raymore Drive. At first, the Humber was causing slow flooding, which allowed some residents to evacuate. However, as the water rose, the footbridge became unstable, and was eventually torn off one abutment, but it was not immediately swept away. Due to the size of the river, the bridge was big enough to substantially redirect debris and water onto Raymore Drive and into the neighbourhood. The water rose by over 6 m (20 ft) in a flood that suddenly became violent. The Humber's waters eventually seized the bridge, which became akin to a battering ram and caused property damage.

Aided by the severed bridge, the water swept entire homes away. The massive flood destroyed 366 metres (1,201 ft) (39 percent) of the road as well as 14 homes, many with their occupants inside. Some areas were fully submerged by the river, while where the heavy flood had started to recede, it only left mud in its wake. Many victims' bodies were never recovered. The worst-hit home was located at 148 Raymore Drive, which was shared by the Edwards and Neil families. Nine inhabitants died—three adults and six children; the bodies of two-year-old Frank and three-month-old John Edwards were never recovered.

The rise of the river was unprecedented and some residents did not evacuate, which led to the high death toll. The Army was called in to assist in the cleanup. The flood damage was so severe that the area that was flooded along Raymore Drive ceased to be a residential area and became a park because of the risk of a similar flood happening again. In contrast, some homes on the street that were a little higher and farther away from the river's bend escaped with as little as minor flooding in the basement. Of the 81 Canadian deaths as a result of Hurricane Hazel, 35 lived on Raymore Drive.

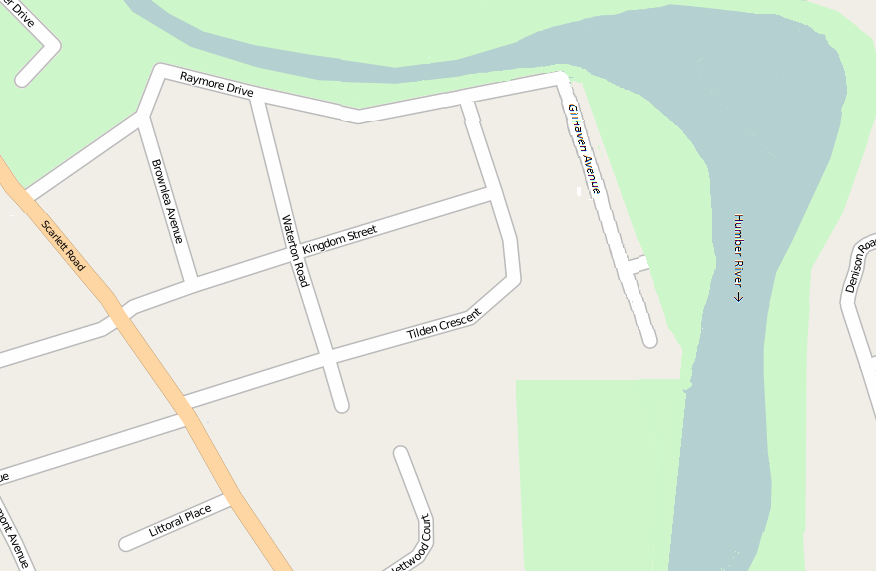
Raymore Drive, during Hurricane Hazel, with the Humber River at maximum flood stage

== After Hazel ==
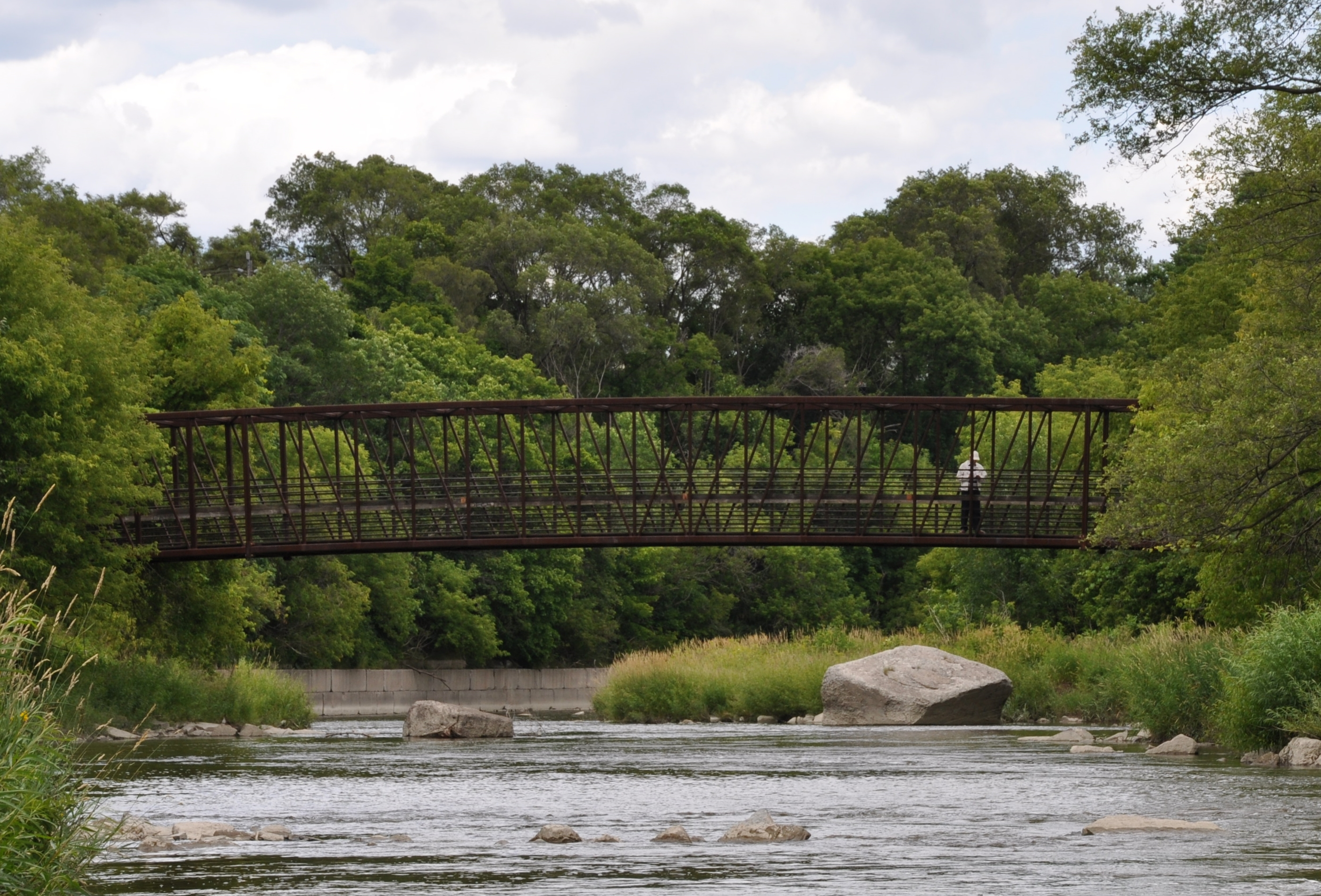
A new footbridge was built in 1995 to span the Humber, between Lions and Raymore Parks.

In the aftermath of Hurricane Hazel, land in heavily flooded areas was expropriated, and residential development on it was prohibited. In the case of Raymore Drive, everything east of Tilden Crescent was turned into a park, which shares its name with the street. The footbridge was rebuilt in 1995 a few metres downstream. An abutment from the old bridge to this day remains in the park after being carried up by the waters, and the other is in the river. A memorial plaque has been placed on the rebuilt footbridge, and the old bridge abutment has also been refashioned into a memorial display.

Raymore Drive is a mostly residential street today. Since Hazel, the street until Tilden Crescent has not changed significantly, but after Tilden, it is an access road to Raymore Park. The street ends in a parking lot for visitors, which is located where Gilhaven Avenue previously ran. (Gilhaven Avenue no longer exists, as it was completely expropriated in the process of creating Raymore Park.)

Raymore Park includes the former residential area of Raymore Drive between Tilden Crescent and the Humber River, and the former residential area of Gilhaven Avenue. It extends a bit more to the south of the former neighbourhood. The park has an area of 11.8 ha (29 acres) and contains a 1.44 km (0.89 mi) trail, playground, and baseball diamonds.

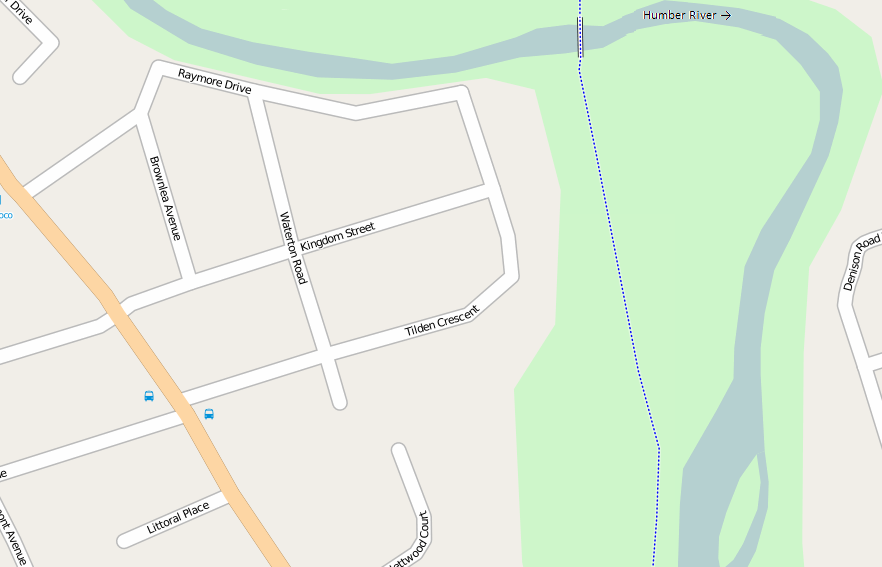
Raymore Drive today

== See also ==
- History of Toronto
- Geography and climate of Toronto
- List of Toronto parks
