= Geography of Toronto =

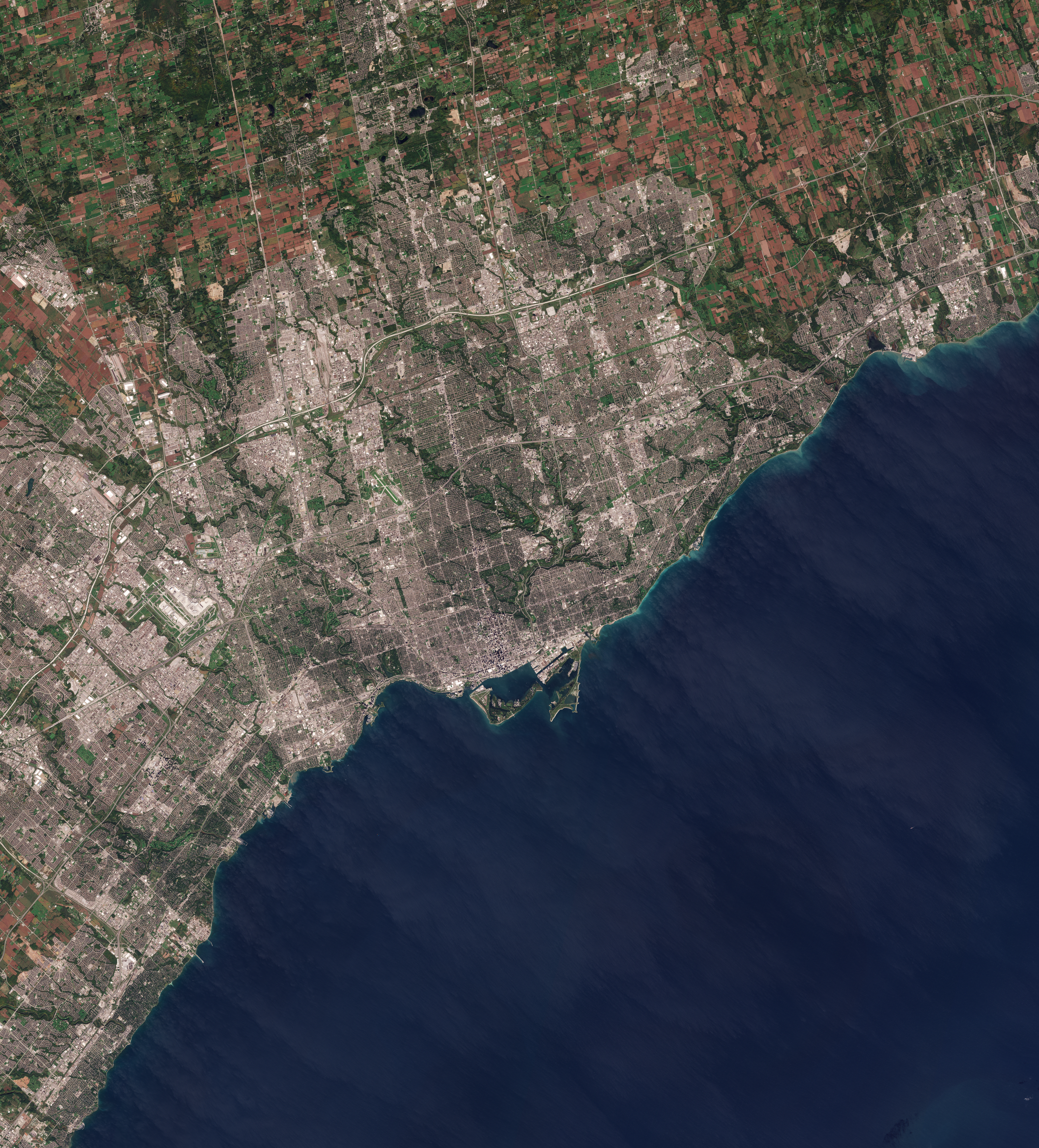
Satellite image of Toronto in 2018

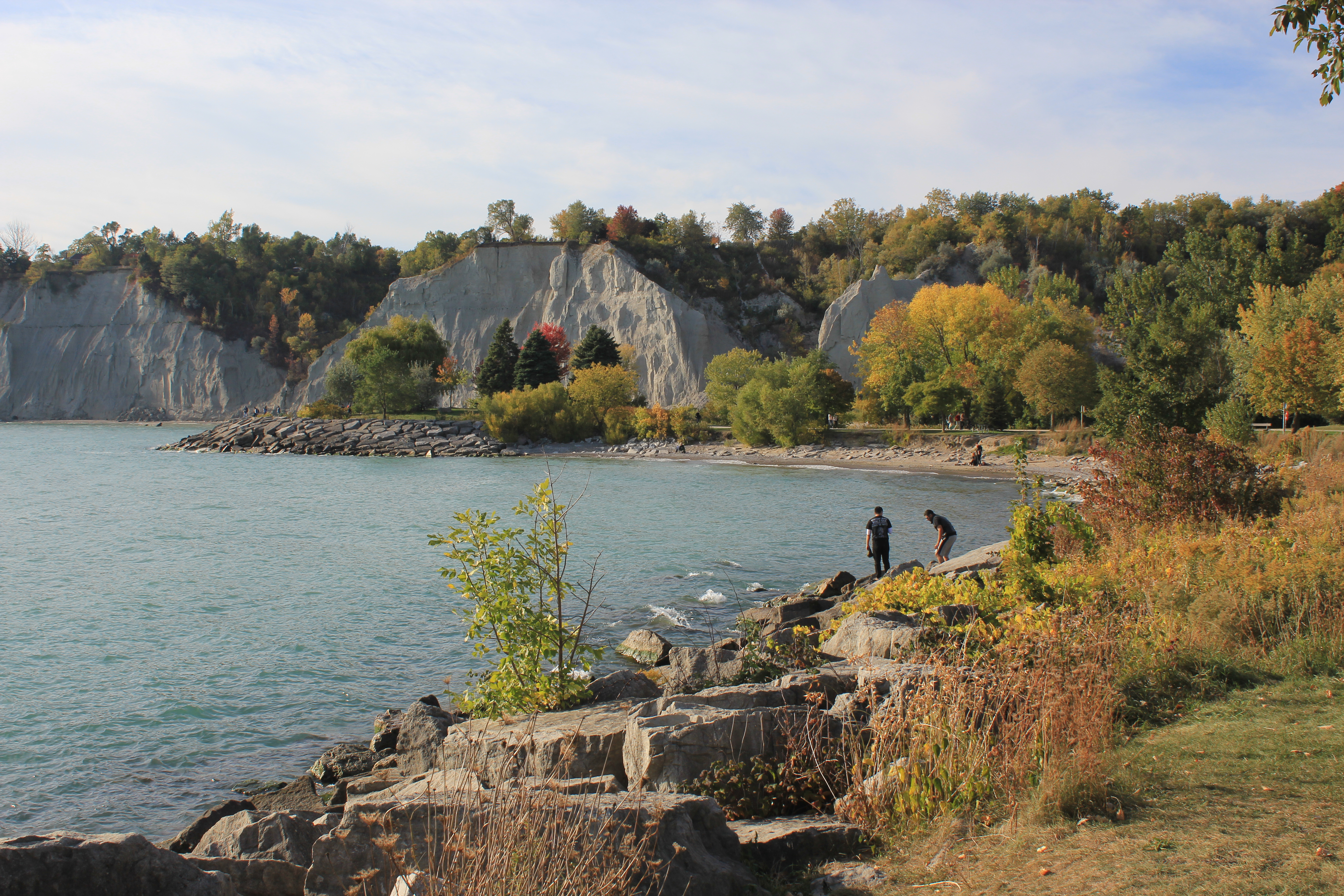
The Toronto waterfront along the Scarborough Bluffs, an escarpment along Lake Ontario.

The geography of Toronto, Ontario, covers an area of 630 square kilometres (240 sq mi) and is bounded by Lake Ontario to the south; Etobicoke Creek, Eglinton Avenue, and Highway 427 to the west; Steeles Avenue to the north; and the Rouge River and the Scarborough–Pickering Townline to the east. In addition to Etobicoke Creek and the Rouge River, the city is trisected by two minor rivers and their tributaries, the Humber River in the west end and the Don River east of downtown. Both flow southward to Lake Ontario at Humber Bay and Toronto Harbour, respectively, which are part of the longer Waterfront, as well as Etobicoke Creek and the Rouge River.

The concentration and protection of Toronto's many deep ravines allows for large tracts of densely forested valleys with recreational trails within the city. Approximately 26 to 28 percent of Toronto is covered with over ten million trees, a fairly high percentage within a large city in North America and there are ambitious proposals to double the coverage. Some parts of Toronto, such as High Park, Swansea and the lower Humber River, are located in the northernmost reaches of the Carolinian forest zone found in North America.

The shoreline of the former Lake Iroquois is a major east−west geological feature, which was formed at the end of the Last Glacial Period. In the west end, Davenport Road follows the ancient shoreline with the steps to Casa Loma rising above and downtown skyscrapers clearly visible to the southeast. It merges with the current Lake Ontario shoreline at the Scarborough Bluffs promontory.

The Toronto Islands are the only group of natural islands located on the western shores of Lake Ontario and were formed from the erosion of the Scarborough Bluffs. The Toronto Islands were originally a sand spit until a major storm separated them from the mainland during the late 1850s. Artificial islands include Ookwemin Minising and the islands that constitute Ontario Place.

Toronto's immediate neighbours are Mississauga and Brampton within the Regional Municipality of Peel, Vaughan and Markham within the Regional Municipality of York, and Pickering within the Regional Municipality of Durham. The Greater Toronto Area (GTA) includes the regional municipalities of Halton, Peel, York and Durham.

The GTA is part of a larger, natural ecosystem known as the Greater Toronto Bioregion. This ecosystem is bounded by Lake Ontario, the Niagara Escarpment, and the Oak Ridges Moraine, and includes many watersheds that drain into Lake Ontario.

In March 2005, the Government of Ontario unveiled the boundaries of a greenbelt around the Greater Toronto Area, a 7,200-square-kilometre (2,800 sq mi) area stretching from Niagara Falls to Peterborough. The green belt is designed to curb urban sprawl and to preserve valuable natural areas and farmland surrounding the city. However, some types of development including detached single residential, quarries and commercial facilities continue to get approved, exerting pressure and population growth on the Greenbelt. Toronto is among the latest in a line of cities that have implemented growth boundaries of some kind as a method of restricting urban growth, including Ottawa; Montreal; Lexington, Kentucky; Nashville and Knoxville, Tennessee; Minneapolis, Seattle, Greater Vancouver, Miami, Portland, Oregon; Frankfurt; Melbourne; Seoul; and London.

== Climate ==
Toronto (The Annex)

Climate chart (precipitation, max. and min. temperature)
J	F	M	A	M	J	J	A	S	O	N	D
62 0 −7	55 1 −6	54 5 −2	68 12 4	82 19 10	71 24 15	64 27 18	81 26 18	85 22 14	64 15 8	84 8 2	61 3 −3
- █ Average max. and min. temperatures in °C
- █ Precipitation totals in mm
- Source: Environment and Climate Change Canada
Imperial conversion
J	F	M	A	M	J	J	A	S	O	N	D
2.4 31 20	2.2 33 21	2.1 41 29	2.7 53 39	3.2 66 50	2.8 76 59	2.5 81 65	3.2 79 64	3.3 72 57	2.5 58 46	3.3 47 36	2.4 37 27
- █ Average max. and min. temperatures in °F
- █ Precipitation totals in inches

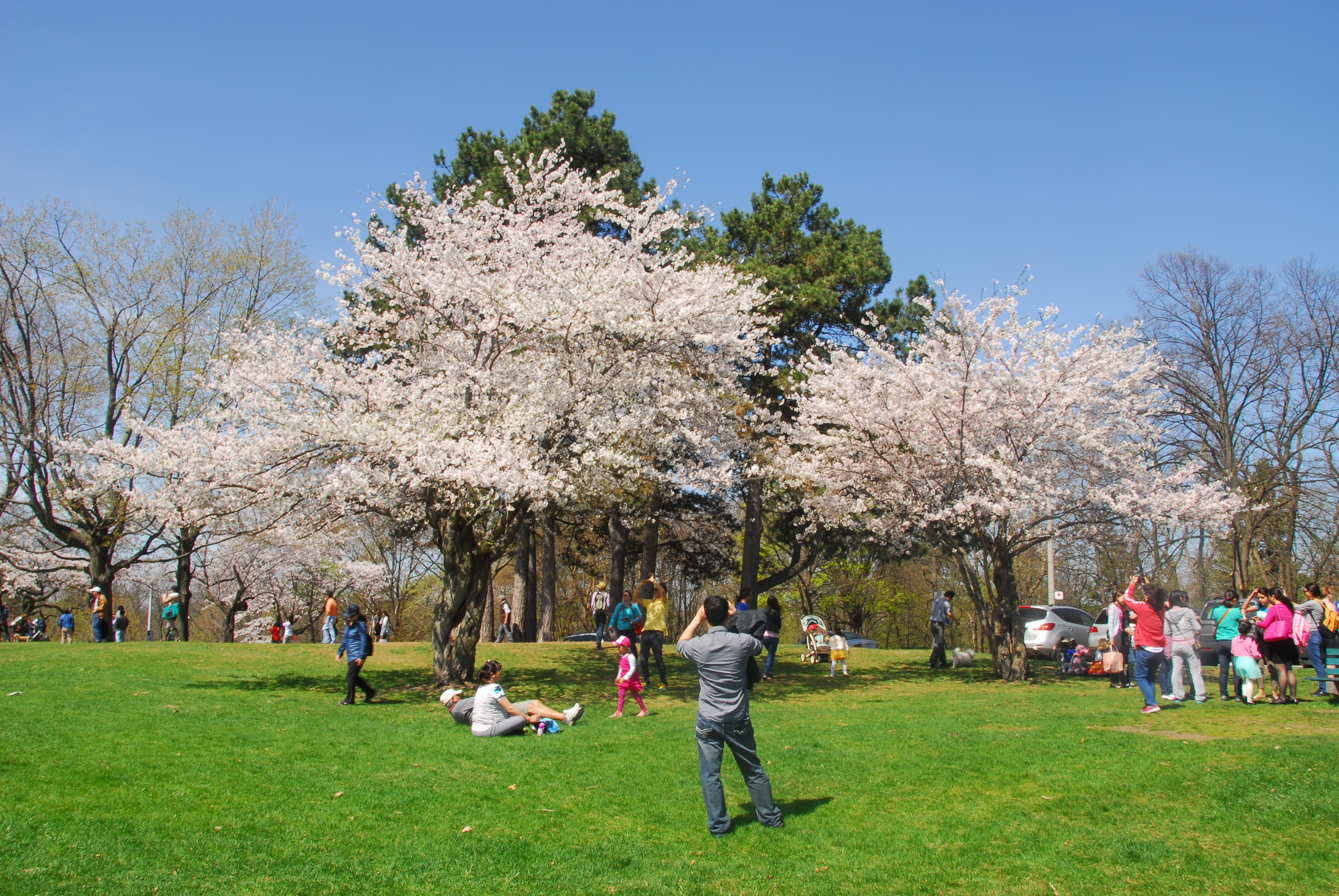
Cherry blossom (sakura) trees blooming in High Park in 2015

Toronto's continental climate is moderated by Lake Ontario; its climate is among the mildest in Canada east of the Rocky Mountains, given Toronto's southerly latitude within the country. Downtown Toronto sits in a pocket of the humid continental climate (Köppen: Dfa) zone found at the southwestern end of Lake Ontario covering the southern part of the city — including downtown (but excluding the Toronto Islands), where the annual average temperature exceeds 9 °C (48 °F). Toronto is located in hardiness zone 7a, with decreasing hardiness further away from the downtown core (5b in the suburbs). There is a high degree of variability from year to year and sometimes over a period of days, particularly during the winter months. Though not native to North America, cherry blossom (sakura) trees bloom in Toronto during late April and early May.

Lake Ontario's water temperature varies due to upwelling of colder water or warmer pools of surface water creating very localized thermal contrast; the deeper waters of the lake, far from the shore, remain at a near-constant water temperature of 4 °C (39 °F), the effect of which is either cooling or warming (in winter). This creates generally warmer nights through the colder season than would otherwise occur. When offshore winds blow in summer, they warm as they near the lakeshore in the evening; conversely, the cooling effect by the lake is most pronounced on spring afternoons, which can affect Toronto even more than other cities on the Great Lakes due its exposure to onshore winds from the east to southeast, on some days, the temperatures can be as much as 10 °C (18 °F) cooler than areas far removed from Lake Ontario, an effect that wanes by summer when the dominant windflow becomes more southwesterly and the lake surface temperature warms.

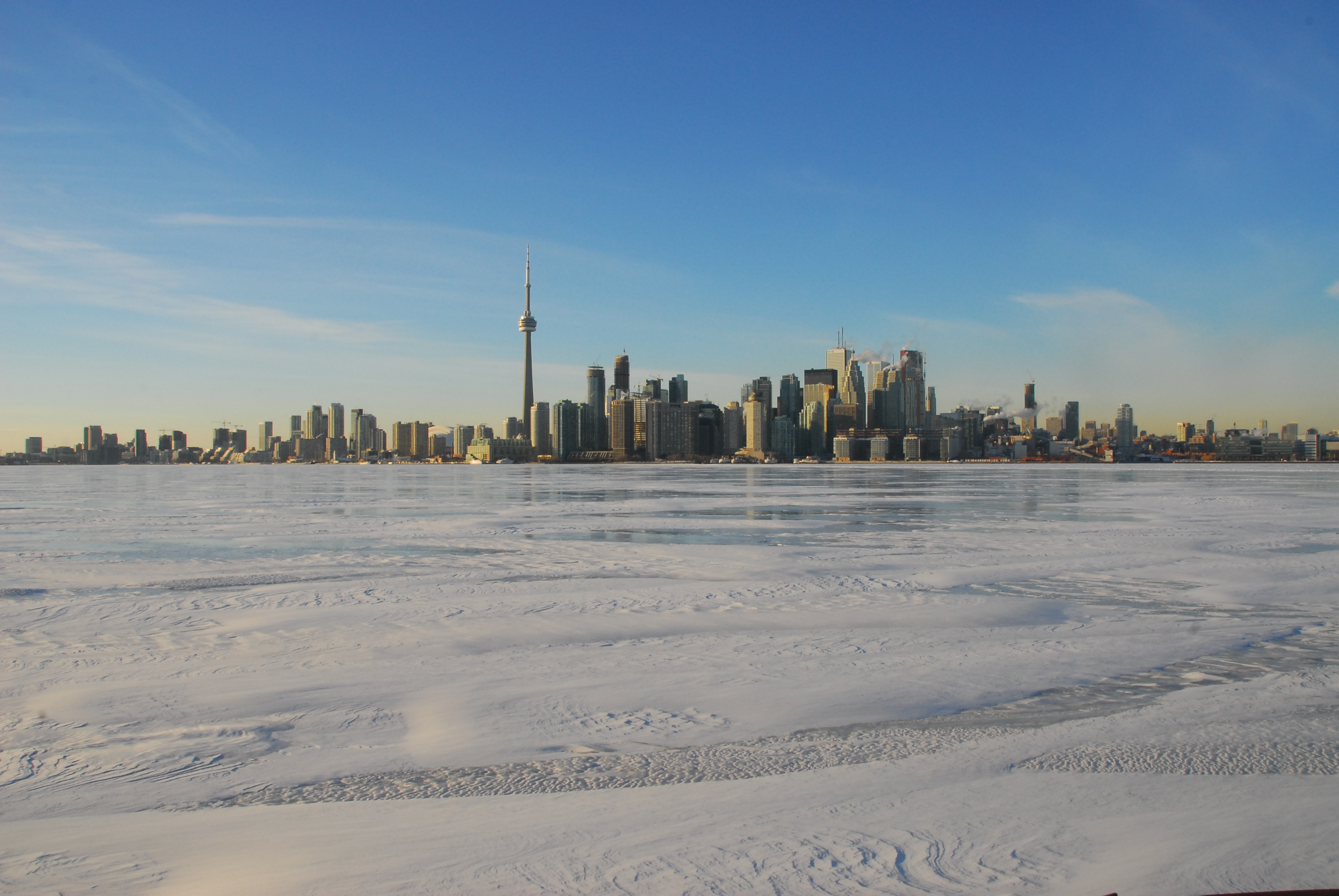
Toronto's Inner Harbour frozen over in 2014. Contrasting deeper areas of the lake, situated further away from the waterfront, waters near the shoreline may occasionally freeze over.

Springs and autumns are shorter seasons than summers and winters, and they feature varied weather with alternating periods of dry, sunny weather and rain. Many days in these seasons are sunny with pleasant rather than warm or cold temperatures. Nights are generally cool, but frosts are rare. Snow can fall in early spring or late fall but usually melt quickly after contact with the ground. At these changeable times of the year, temperature contrasts (up to 30 °C (54 °F) in extreme cases) can occur within short time frames due to rapidly changing air masses that sweep across the continent, often accompanied by high winds. Due to these airmass changes, temperatures of 30 °C (86 °F) or above have been recorded as early as April 16 and as late as October 8. Conversely, temperatures of −10 °C (14 °F) or below at night have been recorded as early as November 6 and as late as April 18. Snowfall has been reported as early as October 1 and as late as May 28. Toronto's weather is affected by the relative position of the polar jet stream and continental storm track, both of which pass over or near to the area with some frequency. This is determined by a number of complex global weather drivers, such as El Niño–Southern Oscillation (ENSO), North Atlantic oscillation (NOA) / Arctic oscillation (AO) and the polar vortex.

There is no "dry season" as precipitation falls in all months with regularity (but mainly snow during the winter), but summer rains result mostly from thunderstorms, which make for higher average amounts as a general rule with occasional dry periods. February and March rank as the driest months on average. According to Environment and Climate Change Canada, from 1991 to 2020, annual average precipitation is 831 mm (32.72 in).

=== Winter and snowfall ===
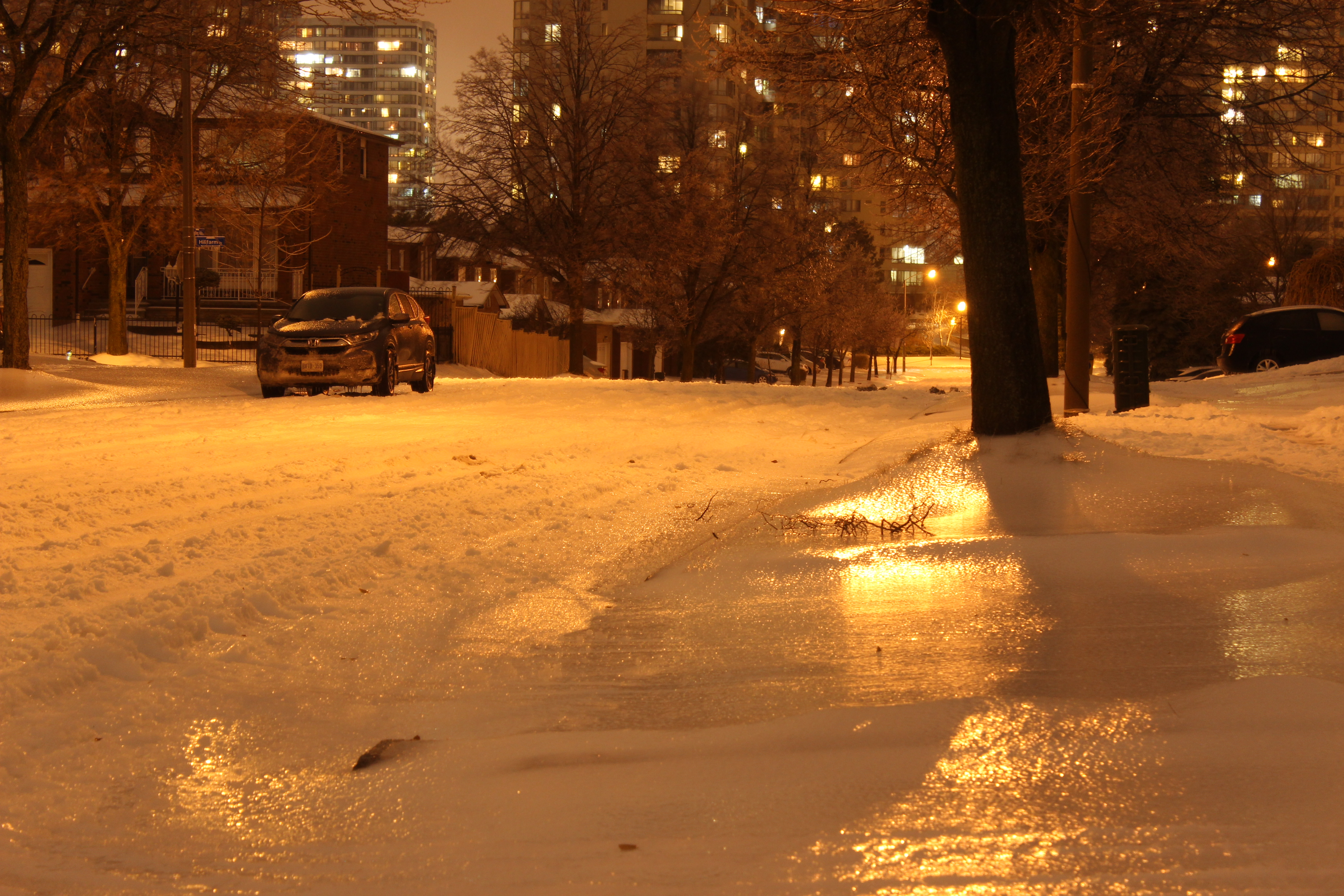
Milliken, a residential Scarborough neighbourhood, during an ice storm, on April 15, 2018.

Despite being cold, extended snow-free periods occur in most winter seasons and precipitation can fall as rain with temperatures sometimes climbing above 10 °C (50 °F). Average winter snowfall is 121.5 cm (47.83 in) at the weather station in Downtown Toronto and 108.5 cm (42.72 in) at Toronto Pearson International Airport.

The average January maximum / minimum is between −1 and −7 °C (30 and 19 °F) in the city. There are usually a few colder periods where temperatures remain below −10 °C (14 °F) and less frequently below −20 °C (−4 °F) at night (especially in the northern suburbs), with wind chills making it feel like −30 °C (−22 °F).

Due to its position on the northwest shore of Lake Ontario, Toronto is not a direct target of heavy, wind−whipped lake-effect snow squalls that hit other Great Lake cities on the south/east shorelines of the lakes, in areas where prevailing winds amplify lake effect. Despite this, there are usually two or more heavy snowfalls each winter which deposit at least 15 cm (5.91 in) accumulation, usually from powerful winter storms known as "Colorado Lows" or panhandle hooks that pick up moisture en route to the Great Lakes. These storms can produce strong easterly driven winds that fetch additional moisture from Lake Ontario. They frequently come with a volatile mix of snow, ice pellets, freezing rain and sometimes just ordinary rain, all of which can disrupt transportation, and in severe cases, interrupt power supply. Alberta clippers are less impactful, usually crossing the area quickly, bringing widespread but lighter snowfall. A sustained freezing rain event occurred on December 22, 2013, plunging 30 percent of the city into darkness, some until after Christmas Day.

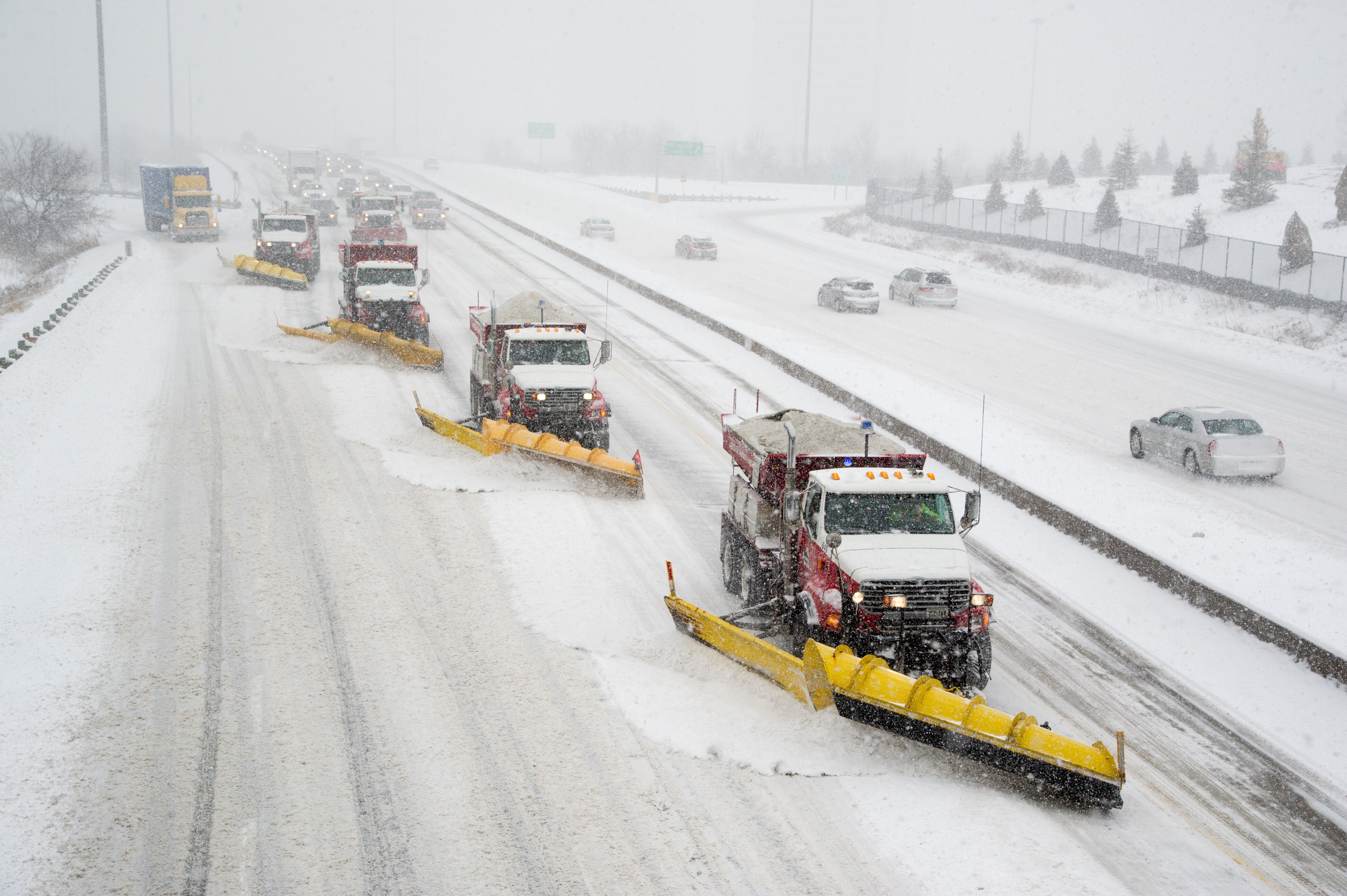
Toronto snowplows clearing the highway of snow during a winter storm in 2013.

On January 13, 1999, after a series of snowstorms, then-Toronto mayor Mel Lastman called in the Canadian Armed Forces to assist with snow removal and clearing streets. Within twelve days, the downtown Toronto weather station at the University of Toronto (Trinity College near Queen's Park) recorded an average season's worth of 118.4 cm (46.61 in) of snow, much of it lake effect from Lake Ontario and a monthly record for January, but fell short of the snowiest month overall March 1870, with 158.5 cm (62.40 in), of which 89 cm (35.04 in) fell over five days. February 2008 set a record a snowfall record for the month with 76.8 cm (30.24 in) falling at the airport, until broken by February 2025 with 78.2 cm (30.79 in). The winter of 2007–08 brought accumulated seasonal snowfall totals of 209.7 cm (82.56 in) downtown and 194.0 cm (76.4 in) at the airport. The heavy winter snows, in combination with record rains during June–July of that year made 2008 the wettest year on the climate record with over 1,070 mm (42.13 in) of total precipitation, until broken by 2024 with 1,146 mm (45.12 in). The largest single 24-hour and daily snowfall records occurred on December 11–12, 1944, when 57.2 cm (22.5 in) accumulated, with 48.3 cm (19.0 in) on December 11 alone. More recently on January 16–17, 2022, a blizzard dropped up to 55 cm (21.7 in) (in sections of Scarborough) of accumulated snow in the city, crippling public transportation, with most of it falling on the morning of January 17. The official storm total at Pearson Airport was 34.4 cm (13.5 in) This record was broken during the January 2026 winter storm, which also broke the record for most snowfall in downtown Toronto.

On the opposite extreme, the winter of 2011–12 had the lowest seasonal snowfall total with only 41.8 cm (16.46 in). March 2012 was the warmest March on record. The least snowfall in a calendar year was 2006, with only 32.4 cm (12.76 in). The strong El Niño influenced winter of 2009–10 had a low total of 52.4 cm (20.63 in), March 2010 recorded no measurable snow, the first such occurrence in any March since 1946, and was followed by the warmest April ever on record.

Winter weather conditions in Toronto can vary greatly from one year to another and is significantly affected by global weather patterns such as El Niño–Southern Oscillation (ENSO). El Niño winters on the weak to moderate side are generally colder or below average in terms of temperatures (such as the winters of 1976–77, 1977–78, 1991–92, 2002–03, 2004–05, early 2007, and 2014–15) with stronger ones being much milder and soggier than normal, with more rainfall and less snowfall than average (such as the winters of 1982–83, 1997–98, December 2006 to mid January 2007, 2009–10, 2015–16 and 2023–24 – second warmest winter), while La Niña winters tend have more precipitation, with more snowfall (the aforementioned 1999, 2000–01, 2008, 2009, 2010–11, 2017–18, 2022, 2024–25, and 2025–26 were La Niña winters), but tend toward above average in terms of temperatures (such as the winters of 2005–06, 2011–12 – warmest winter, 2016–17 and 2022–23). ENSO Neutral years are more unpredictable, such as the much below average winters of 1993–94 and 2013–14, the coldest, longest winter in recent memory.

=== Summer ===
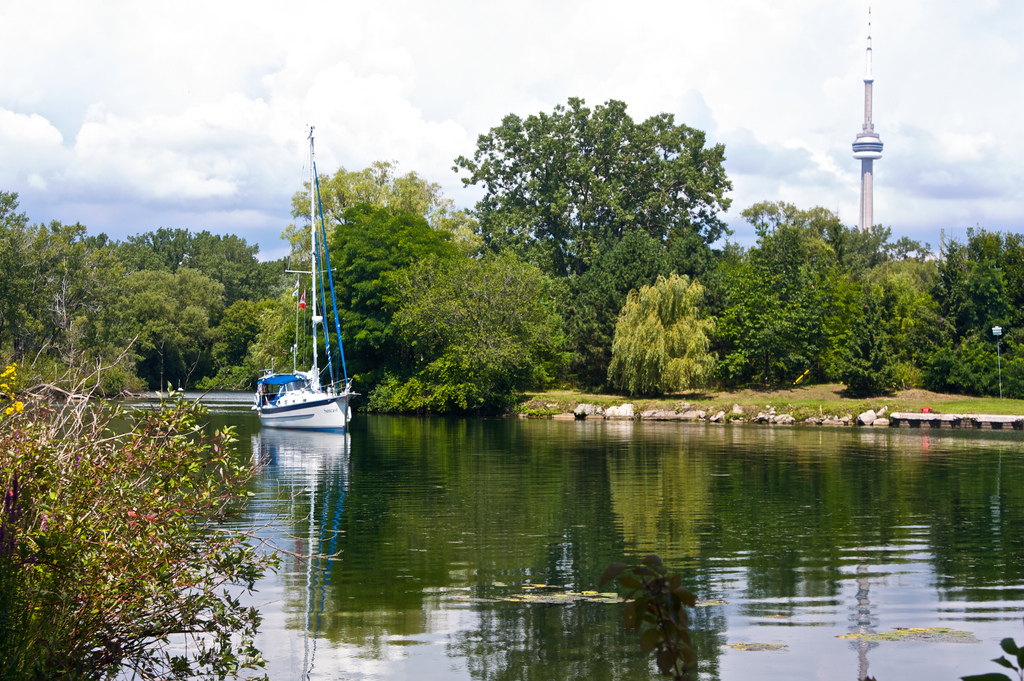
Boating around the Toronto Islands. Excursions to the islands are a popular summer activity in the city.

Maximum temperatures typically range from 24 to 32 °C (75 to 90 °F) with moderate to high humidity, proximity to Lake Ontario and the other lakes contribute to summer humidity but faraway sources like the Gulf of Mexico also factor in. The subtropical jet can move well north of the area in the midsummer, influenced largely by the strength and position of the Bermuda-Azores High and ridging over the North American continent, in some summers, it is a dominating influence. Lake effect cooling varies greatly depending on location within the city and strength and direction of localized winds, variation in water temperature and currents due to recent weather, the most pronounced effect on the Toronto Islands and also on the immediate lakeshore, such as in The Beaches and Scarborough Bluffs, hence the term "cooler by the lake". This is less of a factor in the west and northwest parts of the city. Temperatures over 32 °C (90 °F) occur on average seven days each year (three consecutive days of such temperatures is defined as a heat wave, which occur in most summers but maximums rarely exceed 38 °C (100 °F), which last occurred on July 21, 2011). However, coupled with high humidity, the humidex value can rise well above 40 °C (104 °F) during these heat events, creating great discomfort. Nighttime temperatures generally hover close to 20 °C (68 °F) in the city but during hotter spells remain closer to 25 °C (77 °F). Summer heat episodes are usually broken by cooler, drier periods that can be brief. At Pearson Airport, the yearly maximum daily minimum temperature is 22.8 °C (73.0 °F), and the yearly maximum dew point is 24.0 °C (75.2 °F). Summer 1996 recorded the lowest yearly maximum temperature of 30.6 °C (87.1 °F) at Pearson Airport, summer 1976 for the lowest yearly maximum daily minimum temperature of 18.3 °C (64.9 °F), and summer 1960 for the lowest yearly maximum dew point of 21.0 °C (69.8 °F).

Thunderstorms are also a regular occurrence and can pop up quickly, especially west and north of the city in areas more prone to the "lake breeze front" or "lake breeze thunderstorms" phenomenon, in which intense, sharply defined squall lines develop quickly on summer afternoons inland, amplified by localized variation in wind patterns between the Great Lakes. These storms sometimes, but not always move into the city causing localized flooding resulting from downpours with high rainfall amounts, intense lightning but less often severe winds knocking down trees and power lines.

=== Severe weather and records ===
In addition to snowstorms, ice storms, windstorms, heavy rainfall events associated with tropical storms or very severe thunderstorms, tornadoes are rare but do occur, particularly in the northern and western suburbs. That area sits on the northeastern edge of "tornado alley" where tornadoes occur with the most frequency per area in Canada. Downtown Toronto, on the other hand, generally avoids tornadic storm due to lake breeze inflows, which help break up the formation of tornadoes. Tornado warnings have been posted for the city on a few occasions in the early 21st century, however, no touchdowns have been confirmed within city limits since a weak tornado hit Scarborough in 1998. A pair of dangerous F2 tornadoes did touchdown in neighbouring Vaughan during a tornado outbreak on August 20, 2009 a few kilometres from Canada's Wonderland. A powerful derecho affected the city on May 21, 2022.

Toronto is susceptible to flash flooding due to its various ravines and valleys that can easily flood, as well as generally poor drainage due to its large urban area. Flooding can result from remnants of tropical storms, heavy rainfall combined with snow melt, or summertime thunderstorms stalled out along lake breeze boundaries. Low-lying areas, such as the lower reaches of the Don River valley, are the most likely to flood. This often leads to the shutdown of the Don Valley Parkway and GO Transit's Richmond Hill line. A second mouth has been built for the Don River during the early 2020s to mitigate flooding in the Port Lands, creating the island of Ookwemin Minising, which will have mixed-use high-density residential development.

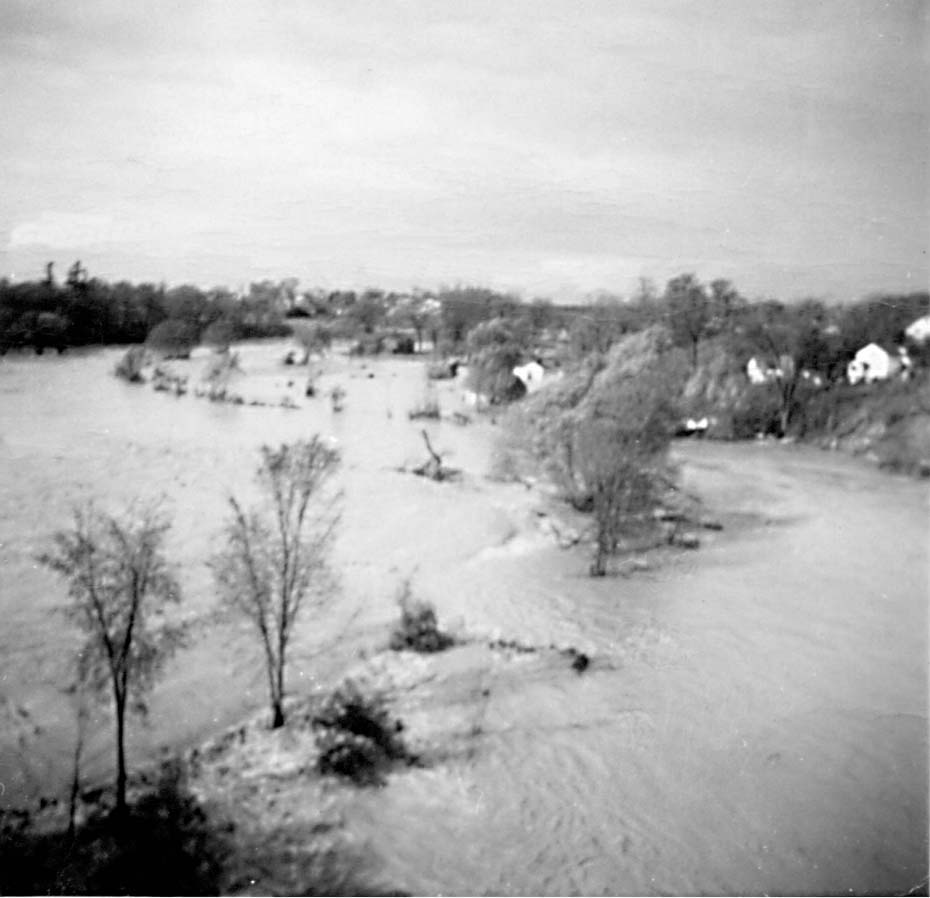
The Weston Golf and Country Club was left submerged after the Humber River overflowed its banks during Hurricane Hazel in 1954.

The tropical storm remnant of Hurricane Hazel caused 81 deaths in October 1954 due to flooding that swept homes along river banks into Lake Ontario. A sudden downburst during a strong thunderstorm was believed to have played a contributing factor in the Air France Flight 358 crash on August 2, 2005. Just a few weeks later on August 19, part of a tornado outbreak in Southern Ontario, record-breaking intense rainfall, the worst since Hazel, deluged north-central sections of the city within about two hours and destroying a section of Finch Avenue West over Black Creek in North York resulting in record insurance claims. Some rain gauges recorded 175 mm (7 in) of rain, over 100 mm (4 in) in just one hour. Another large rainstorm with intense, record rainfall amounts struck a wide swath of the city during the afternoon rush hour on July 8, 2013, flooding city streets, subway tunnels, basements and knocking out power for over two million residents, stranding commuters, some having to be rescued from a submerged train. A daily rainfall record of 126.4 mm (4.98 in) was set at Pearson Airport, most falling in an hour and a half. Flood insurance claims are likely to exceed the 2005 storm due to a wider area affected. In the springs of 2017 and 2019, heavy rain combined with snow melt led to the water levels of Lake Ontario to rise to record levels, flooding parts of the Toronto Islands and closing it to the public.

The most severe heat wave in Toronto occurred in 1936, during that year's heat wave, when downtown temperatures in Toronto exceeded 40 °C (104 °F) on three consecutive days ( July 8–10), with nighttime temperatures not falling below 25 °C (77 °F). The city was ill-equipped at that time to handle such a prolonged extreme heat wave, and heat stroke claimed 225 lives in the city, not counting indirect deaths from causes such as drowning. The hottest month recorded, however, was July 1921, when the average maximum temperature downtown was 31.2 °C (88.2 °F), with a monthly mean temperature of 25.5 °C (77.9 °F), this was equalled in July 2020. At Toronto Pearson International Airport, the highest temperature was 38.3 °C (100.9 °F) on August 25, 1948, the highest monthly maximum average was 31.2 °C (88.2 °F) in July 1955, however the highest mean of 25.0 °C (77.0 °F) was set in July 2020, records there began in 1937. July 2020 also set Pearson Airport's record for the warmest monthly average daily minimum temperature at 19.5 °C (67.1 °F), and set the record of no daily maximum temperature below 25.3 °C (77.5 °F) or daily minimum temperature below 15.3 °C (59.5 °F) for the entire month. The highest humidex (combined feel of temperature and humidity) reached 50.3 °C (122.5 °F) at the airport during the heat wave of July 1995, downtown it reached 51.2 °C (124.2 °F) on July 21, 2011, during the 2011 North American heat wave. The July 1995 heat wave also set the all time record high dew point of 26.6 °C (79.9 °F) on July 15, 1995 at Pearson Airport. The most humid month was July 2010 with an average dew point of 17.4 °C (63.3 °F) at Pearson Airport. July 1993 recorded no dew point below 8.1 °C (46.6 °F) for the entire month at Pearson Airport. The record high daily minimum at Pearson Airport was 26.3 °C (79.3 °F) recorded August 1, 2006.

The coldest minimum temperature of −33 °C (−27 °F) was recorded on January 10, 1859. The coldest temperature recorded at the airport was −31.3 °C (−24.3 °F) on January 4, 1981, and the coldest windchill recorded was −44.7 °C (−48.5 °F) on the same day. The coldest month overall was −12.6 °C (9.3 °F) at the airport in February 2015 and at downtown in February 1875. Other notable cold waves occurred in January 1994 and February 1934. Winter cold snaps pose a danger as they often come with high winds, leaving the city's homeless population very vulnerable to frostbite and hypothermia.

=== Upward temperature trend ===
Based on public records provided by Environment and Climate Change Canada, the average annual temperature has increased 1.5 °C (2.7 °F) at Pearson Airport over a period of 30 years. If compared with the thirty-year normals from 1971 to 2000, more of this increase occurred at night: the average minimum temperature has been 1.9 °C (3.4 °F) higher. Average precipitation during the same period was close to the average of the previous period, snowfall totals down only marginally with slightly higher rainfall. In order from the top: December, September, July and January have seen the highest average temperature increases. Part of this warming is likely attributed to increased urban growth surrounding the airport.

An older study conducted in the 1990s analyzed the heat island effect comparing data from selected regional stations, including both Downtown Toronto and Pearson Airport, enough for a large area of the pre-1998 city limits and parts of Etobicoke to have a different Köppen climate classification from the surrounding area.

=== Statistics ===
Climate data for Toronto (The Annex) WMO ID: 71266; coordinates 43°40′N 79°24′W; elevation: 112.5 m (369 ft); 1991–2020 (Note: Humidex, wind chill, average rain, average snow, rain days, snow days, and sunshine are from 1981 to 2010) normals, extremes 1840–present (Note: Maximum and minimum temperature data at The Annex was recorded by human observers from March 1840 to June 2003 under the station name "TORONTO". From July 2003 to present, climate data has been recorded by an automatic weather station under the name "TORONTO CITY".)
Month	Jan	Feb	Mar	Apr	May	Jun	Jul	Aug	Sep	Oct	Nov	Dec	Year
Record high humidex	15.7	12.2	21.7	31.6	39.8	44.5	43.0	42.6	43.8	31.2	26.1	17.7	44.5
Record high °C (°F)	16.1 (61.0)	19.1 (66.4)	26.7 (80.1)	32.2 (90.0)	34.4 (93.9)	36.7 (98.1)	40.6 (105.1)	38.9 (102.0)	37.8 (100.0)	30.8 (87.4)	23.9 (75.0)	19.9 (67.8)	40.6 (105.1)
Mean daily maximum °C (°F)	−0.3 (31.5)	0.6 (33.1)	5.1 (41.2)	11.7 (53.1)	18.8 (65.8)	24.2 (75.6)	27.0 (80.6)	26.1 (79.0)	22.0 (71.6)	14.6 (58.3)	8.1 (46.6)	2.6 (36.7)	13.4 (56.1)
Daily mean °C (°F)	−3.5 (25.7)	−2.7 (27.1)	1.7 (35.1)	7.8 (46.0)	14.5 (58.1)	19.8 (67.6)	22.5 (72.5)	21.9 (71.4)	17.9 (64.2)	11.2 (52.2)	5.2 (41.4)	−0.1 (31.8)	9.7 (49.5)
Mean daily minimum °C (°F)	−6.7 (19.9)	−6.0 (21.2)	−1.8 (28.8)	3.9 (39.0)	10.0 (50.0)	15.3 (59.5)	18.1 (64.6)	17.7 (63.9)	13.8 (56.8)	7.7 (45.9)	2.3 (36.1)	−2.7 (27.1)	6.0 (42.8)
Record low °C (°F)	−32.8 (−27.0)	−31.7 (−25.1)	−26.7 (−16.1)	−15.0 (5.0)	−3.9 (25.0)	−2.2 (28.0)	3.9 (39.0)	4.4 (39.9)	−2.2 (28.0)	−8.9 (16.0)	−20.6 (−5.1)	−30.0 (−22.0)	−32.8 (−27.0)
Record low wind chill	−37	−34	−26	−17	−8	0	0	0	0	−8	−17	−34	−37
Average precipitation mm (inches)	64.6 (2.54)	53.9 (2.12)	52.8 (2.08)	78.0 (3.07)	76.4 (3.01)	81.6 (3.21)	76.5 (3.01)	71.9 (2.83)	69.4 (2.73)	69.1 (2.72)	70.8 (2.79)	57.8 (2.28)	822.7 (32.39)
Average rainfall mm (inches)	29.1 (1.15)	29.7 (1.17)	33.6 (1.32)	61.1 (2.41)	82.0 (3.23)	70.9 (2.79)	63.9 (2.52)	81.1 (3.19)	84.7 (3.33)	64.3 (2.53)	75.4 (2.97)	38.2 (1.50)	714.0 (28.11)
Average snowfall cm (inches)	37.2 (14.6)	27.0 (10.6)	19.8 (7.8)	5.0 (2.0)	0.0 (0.0)	0.0 (0.0)	0.0 (0.0)	0.0 (0.0)	0.0 (0.0)	0.1 (0.0)	8.3 (3.3)	24.1 (9.5)	121.5 (47.8)
Average precipitation days (≥ 0.2 mm)	16.3	12.8	13.0	13.1	13.4	12.1	11.7	9.5	10.2	11.4	13.0	13.7	150.2
Average rainy days (≥ 0.2 mm)	5.4	4.8	7.9	11.2	12.7	11.0	10.4	10.2	11.1	11.7	10.9	7.0	114.1
Average snowy days (≥ 0.2 cm)	12.0	8.7	6.5	2.2	0.0	0.0	0.0	0.0	0.0	0.08	3.1	8.4	40.9
Average relative humidity (%) (at 15:00 LST)	68.0	65.4	58.5	53.4	53.1	55.2	54.3	56.7	59.6	65.0	67.1	70.9	60.6
Mean monthly sunshine hours	85.9	111.3	161.0	180.0	227.7	259.6	279.6	245.6	194.4	154.3	88.9	78.1	2,066.3
Percentage possible sunshine	29.7	37.7	43.6	44.8	50.0	56.3	59.8	56.7	51.7	45.1	30.5	28.0	44.5
Source: Environment and Climate Change Canada

Climate data for Lester B. Pearson International Airport (Brampton and North Mississauga) WMO ID: 71624; coordinates 43°40′38″N 79°37′50″W, elevation: 173.4 m (569 ft), 1991–2020 normals, extremes 1937–present
Month	Jan	Feb	Mar	Apr	May	Jun	Jul	Aug	Sep	Oct	Nov	Dec	Year
Record high humidex	19.0	18.3	29.6	37.9	42.6	45.6	50.3	46.6	48.0	39.1	28.6	23.9	50.3
Record high °C (°F)	17.6 (63.7)	17.7 (63.9)	26.0 (78.8)	31.1 (88.0)	34.4 (93.9)	36.7 (98.1)	37.9 (100.2)	38.3 (100.9)	36.7 (98.1)	31.8 (89.2)	25.1 (77.2)	20.0 (68.0)	38.3 (100.9)
Mean maximum °C (°F)	10.0 (50.0)	9.6 (49.3)	16.9 (62.4)	23.6 (74.5)	29.3 (84.7)	32.6 (90.7)	33.1 (91.6)	32.7 (90.9)	31.1 (88.0)	25.6 (78.1)	17.8 (64.0)	11.3 (52.3)	34.5 (94.1)
Mean daily maximum °C (°F)	−1.2 (29.8)	−0.3 (31.5)	5.0 (41.0)	12.0 (53.6)	19.2 (66.6)	24.5 (76.1)	27.4 (81.3)	26.3 (79.3)	22.3 (72.1)	14.6 (58.3)	7.9 (46.2)	1.9 (35.4)	13.3 (55.9)
Daily mean °C (°F)	−5 (23)	−4.4 (24.1)	0.6 (33.1)	7.0 (44.6)	13.7 (56.7)	19.2 (66.6)	22.1 (71.8)	21.1 (70.0)	16.9 (62.4)	10.0 (50.0)	4.1 (39.4)	−1.6 (29.1)	8.6 (47.5)
Mean daily minimum °C (°F)	−8.9 (16.0)	−8.5 (16.7)	−3.8 (25.2)	1.9 (35.4)	8.2 (46.8)	13.9 (57.0)	16.6 (61.9)	15.8 (60.4)	11.6 (52.9)	5.3 (41.5)	0.2 (32.4)	−5 (23)	3.9 (39.0)
Mean minimum °C (°F)	−19.9 (−3.8)	−18.7 (−1.7)	−13.8 (7.2)	−4.8 (23.4)	1.2 (34.2)	7.3 (45.1)	11.4 (52.5)	10.6 (51.1)	4.5 (40.1)	−1.5 (29.3)	−7.9 (17.8)	−14.9 (5.2)	−22.0 (−7.6)
Record low °C (°F)	−31.3 (−24.3)	−31.1 (−24.0)	−28.9 (−20.0)	−17.2 (1.0)	−5.6 (21.9)	0.6 (33.1)	3.9 (39.0)	1.1 (34.0)	−3.9 (25.0)	−8.3 (17.1)	−18.3 (−0.9)	−31.1 (−24.0)	−31.3 (−24.3)
Record low wind chill	−44.7	−38.9	−36.2	−25.4	−9.5	0.0	0.0	0.0	−8.0	−13.5	−25.4	−38.5	−44.7
Average precipitation mm (inches)	61.6 (2.43)	50.2 (1.98)	50.5 (1.99)	76.7 (3.02)	77.6 (3.06)	80.7 (3.18)	74.0 (2.91)	68.5 (2.70)	69.4 (2.73)	67.2 (2.65)	71.8 (2.83)	58.6 (2.31)	806.8 (31.76)
Average rainfall mm (inches)	33.8 (1.33)	23.9 (0.94)	34.0 (1.34)	70.7 (2.78)	77.5 (3.05)	80.7 (3.18)	74.0 (2.91)	68.5 (2.70)	69.4 (2.73)	67.0 (2.64)	62.7 (2.47)	35.3 (1.39)	697.4 (27.46)
Average snowfall cm (inches)	31.5 (12.4)	27.7 (10.9)	17.2 (6.8)	4.5 (1.8)	0.1 (0.0)	0.0 (0.0)	0.0 (0.0)	0.0 (0.0)	0.0 (0.0)	0.2 (0.1)	9.3 (3.7)	24.1 (9.5)	114.5 (45.1)
Average precipitation days (≥ 0.2 mm)	16.2	12.0	12.3	12.5	12.7	10.8	10.3	9.8	10.2	12.8	12.6	14.9	147.3
Average rainy days (≥ 0.2 mm)	6.2	4.6	7.2	11.7	12.7	10.8	10.3	9.8	10.2	12.8	10.4	7.5	114.1
Average snowy days (≥ 0.2 cm)	12.7	9.7	6.8	2.2	0.12	0.0	0.0	0.0	0.0	0.24	3.6	9.2	44.7
Average relative humidity (%) (at 15:00)	69.7	65.7	58.5	53.4	53.6	54.4	52.9	55.2	57.3	61.6	66.7	70.5	60.0
Average dew point °C (°F)	−8.6 (16.5)	−8.4 (16.9)	−5.2 (22.6)	−0.4 (31.3)	6.4 (43.5)	12.3 (54.1)	14.9 (58.8)	14.9 (58.8)	11.6 (52.9)	5.5 (41.9)	−0.1 (31.8)	−4.9 (23.2)	3.2 (37.8)
Mean monthly sunshine hours	79.7	112.2	159.4	204.4	228.2	249.7	294.4	274.5	215.7	163.7	94.2	86.2	2,161.4
Percentage possible sunshine	27.6	38.0	43.2	50.8	50.1	54.1	63.0	63.4	57.4	47.8	32.0	30.9	46.5
Source 1: Environment and Climate Change Canada
Source 2: weatherstats.ca (for dewpoint and monthly/yearly average absolute maximum/minimum temperature)

Climate data for Toronto (Toronto Island Airport, Harbourfront) WMO ID: 71265; Climate ID: 6158665; coordinates 43°47′43″N 79°23′42″W; elevation: 76.5 m (251 ft) (Note: Includes Toronto City Centre; WMO ID: 71265; Climate ID: 6158667; coordinates 43°47′43″N 79°23′42″W; elevation: 76.8 m (252 ft) and Toronto City Centre; WMO ID: 71265; Climate ID: 6158359; coordinates 43°47′39″N 79°23′46″W; elevation: 76.8 m (252 ft)); 1991–2020 normals (Note: Humidex, temperatures, wind chill and humidity) and 1981–2010 normals (Note: Precipitation and precipitation days), extremes 1905–present
Month	Jan	Feb	Mar	Apr	May	Jun	Jul	Aug	Sep	Oct	Nov	Dec	Year
Record high humidex	13.2	17.5	22.3	31.8	38.8	45.5	48.6	45.3	43.0	38.3	23.3	15.8	48.6
Record high °C (°F)	14.1 (57.4)	18.5 (65.3)	22.5 (72.5)	30.1 (86.2)	34.1 (93.4)	37.2 (99.0)	37.0 (98.6)	36.1 (97.0)	33.4 (92.1)	30.8 (87.4)	20.4 (68.7)	17.3 (63.1)	37.2 (99.0)
Mean daily maximum °C (°F)	−0.5 (31.1)	0.3 (32.5)	4.2 (39.6)	10.2 (50.4)	16.8 (62.2)	22.3 (72.1)	25.3 (77.5)	24.8 (76.6)	20.9 (69.6)	13.8 (56.8)	7.5 (45.5)	2.5 (36.5)	12.4 (54.3)
Daily mean °C (°F)	−3.8 (25.2)	−3.1 (26.4)	0.8 (33.4)	6.5 (43.7)	12.6 (54.7)	18.1 (64.6)	21.0 (69.8)	21.0 (69.8)	17.2 (63.0)	10.5 (50.9)	4.6 (40.3)	−0.3 (31.5)	8.8 (47.8)
Mean daily minimum °C (°F)	−7.1 (19.2)	−6.4 (20.5)	−2.5 (27.5)	2.7 (36.9)	8.3 (46.9)	13.9 (57.0)	16.7 (62.1)	17.2 (63.0)	13.4 (56.1)	7.0 (44.6)	1.7 (35.1)	−3.1 (26.4)	5.1 (41.2)
Record low °C (°F)	−30.0 (−22.0)	−29.4 (−20.9)	−23.1 (−9.6)	−13.3 (8.1)	−3.3 (26.1)	2.2 (36.0)	4.4 (39.9)	5.0 (41.0)	1.7 (35.1)	−5.0 (23.0)	−13.9 (7.0)	−27.2 (−17.0)	−30.0 (−22.0)
Record low wind chill	−36.8	−39.6	−34.0	−17.0	−6.7	0.0	0.0	0.0	0.0	−5.0	−21.2	−34.4	−39.6
Average precipitation mm (inches)	45.3 (1.78)	48.6 (1.91)	54.8 (2.16)	63.9 (2.52)	75.0 (2.95)	62.7 (2.47)	65.0 (2.56)	84.8 (3.34)	86.3 (3.40)	67.1 (2.64)	83.4 (3.28)	60.4 (2.38)	797.3 (31.39)
Average rainfall mm (inches)	19.5 (0.77)	23.0 (0.91)	39.6 (1.56)	61.5 (2.42)	75.0 (2.95)	62.7 (2.47)	65.0 (2.56)	84.8 (3.34)	86.3 (3.40)	67.1 (2.64)	78.5 (3.09)	41.1 (1.62)	704.0 (27.72)
Average snowfall cm (inches)	28.1 (11.1)	26.3 (10.4)	15.5 (6.1)	2.7 (1.1)	0.0 (0.0)	0.0 (0.0)	0.0 (0.0)	0.0 (0.0)	0.0 (0.0)	0.03 (0.01)	4.8 (1.9)	19.7 (7.8)	97.1 (38.2)
Average precipitation days (≥ 0.2 mm)	13.9	11.6	11.7	12.7	12.3	10.7	10.3	10.9	11.4	12.3	13.4	13.0	144.2
Average rainy days (≥ 0.2 mm)	4.4	5.1	8.4	11.8	12.3	10.7	10.3	10.9	11.4	12.3	12.0	7.4	117.0
Average snowy days (≥ 0.2 cm)	10.5	8.3	5.3	1.6	0.0	0.0	0.0	0.0	0.0	0.07	2.4	7.7	35.6
Average relative humidity (%) (at 1500 LST)	69.5	66.8	63.6	63.4	66.1	67.9	67.2	68.3	67.4	69.5	70.8	70.6	67.6
Source: Environment and Climate Change Canada (June maximum) (January minimum) (Canadian Climate Normals 1981–2010}

Climate data for Toronto Pearson International Airport (1971–2000)
Month	Jan	Feb	Mar	Apr	May	Jun	Jul	Aug	Sep	Oct	Nov	Dec	Year
Mean daily maximum °C (°F)	−2.1 (28.2)	−1.1 (30.0)	4.1 (39.4)	11.5 (52.7)	18.8 (65.8)	23.7 (74.7)	26.8 (80.2)	25.6 (78.1)	21.0 (69.8)	13.9 (57.0)	7.0 (44.6)	0.9 (33.6)	12.5 (54.5)
Daily mean °C (°F)	−6.3 (20.7)	−5.4 (22.3)	−0.4 (31.3)	6.3 (43.3)	12.9 (55.2)	17.8 (64.0)	20.8 (69.4)	19.9 (67.8)	15.3 (59.5)	8.9 (48.0)	3.2 (37.8)	−2.9 (26.8)	7.5 (45.5)
Mean daily minimum °C (°F)	−10.5 (13.1)	−9.7 (14.5)	−5 (23)	1.0 (33.8)	6.9 (44.4)	11.9 (53.4)	14.8 (58.6)	14.0 (57.2)	9.6 (49.3)	3.9 (39.0)	−0.7 (30.7)	−6.7 (19.9)	2.5 (36.5)
Average precipitation mm (inches)	52.2 (2.06)	42.6 (1.68)	57.1 (2.25)	68.4 (2.69)	72.5 (2.85)	74.2 (2.92)	74.4 (2.93)	79.6 (3.13)	77.5 (3.05)	64.1 (2.52)	69.3 (2.73)	60.9 (2.40)	792.7 (31.21)
Average rainfall mm (inches)	24.9 (0.98)	22.3 (0.88)	36.7 (1.44)	62.4 (2.46)	72.4 (2.85)	74.2 (2.92)	74.4 (2.93)	79.6 (3.13)	77.5 (3.05)	63.4 (2.50)	62.0 (2.44)	34.7 (1.37)	684.6 (26.95)
Average snowfall cm (inches)	31.1 (12.2)	22.1 (8.7)	19.2 (7.6)	5.7 (2.2)	0.1 (0.0)	0.0 (0.0)	0.0 (0.0)	0.0 (0.0)	0.0 (0.0)	0.5 (0.2)	7.6 (3.0)	29.2 (11.5)	115.4 (45.4)
Average precipitation days (≥ 0.2 mm)	14.9	11.6	13.1	12.1	11.9	11.0	10.1	10.8	10.7	11.5	13.2	14.6	145.5
Average rainy days (≥ 0.2 mm)	5.1	4.6	8.0	10.7	11.9	11.0	10.1	10.8	10.7	11.5	10.6	6.7	111.8
Average snowy days (≥ 0.2 cm)	12.6	9.4	7.1	2.6	0.07	0.0	0.0	0.0	0.0	0.40	4.0	10.3	46.5
Average relative humidity (%) (at 600 LST)	81.7	81.3	81.2	78.8	80.0	82.6	84.5	88.6	89.5	87.1	84.7	83.7	83.6
Mean monthly sunshine hours	75	114	178	218	244	276	302	264	208	173	94	89	2,235
Source 1: Environment and Climate Change Canada
Source 2: The Weather Network (sun only)

Climate data for Toronto (The Annex), 1971–2000
Month	Jan	Feb	Mar	Apr	May	Jun	Jul	Aug	Sep	Oct	Nov	Dec	Year
Mean daily maximum °C (°F)	−1.1 (30.0)	−0.2 (31.6)	4.6 (40.3)	11.3 (52.3)	18.5 (65.3)	23.5 (74.3)	26.4 (79.5)	25.3 (77.5)	20.7 (69.3)	13.8 (56.8)	7.4 (45.3)	1.8 (35.2)	12.7 (54.9)
Daily mean °C (°F)	−4.2 (24.4)	−3.2 (26.2)	1.3 (34.3)	7.6 (45.7)	14.2 (57.6)	19.2 (66.6)	22.2 (72.0)	21.3 (70.3)	17.0 (62.6)	10.6 (51.1)	4.8 (40.6)	−0.9 (30.4)	9.2 (48.6)
Mean daily minimum °C (°F)	−7.3 (18.9)	−6.3 (20.7)	−2 (28)	3.8 (38.8)	9.9 (49.8)	14.8 (58.6)	17.9 (64.2)	17.3 (63.1)	13.2 (55.8)	7.3 (45.1)	2.2 (36.0)	−3.7 (25.3)	5.6 (42.1)
Average precipitation mm (inches)	61.2 (2.41)	50.5 (1.99)	66.1 (2.60)	69.6 (2.74)	73.3 (2.89)	71.5 (2.81)	67.5 (2.66)	79.6 (3.13)	83.4 (3.28)	64.7 (2.55)	75.7 (2.98)	71.0 (2.80)	834.0 (32.83)
Average rainfall mm (inches)	29.2 (1.15)	26.2 (1.03)	42.0 (1.65)	63.2 (2.49)	73.3 (2.89)	71.5 (2.81)	67.5 (2.66)	79.6 (3.13)	83.4 (3.28)	64.7 (2.55)	67.3 (2.65)	41.9 (1.65)	709.8 (27.94)
Average snowfall cm (inches)	38.2 (15.0)	26.6 (10.5)	22.0 (8.7)	6.0 (2.4)	0.0 (0.0)	0.0 (0.0)	0.0 (0.0)	0.0 (0.0)	0.0 (0.0)	0.1 (0.0)	8.1 (3.2)	32.2 (12.7)	133.1 (52.4)
Average precipitation days (≥ 0.2 mm)	15.3	11.7	12.7	12.1	12.2	11.1	10.3	10.5	10.6	11.4	12.7	14.5	145.1
Average rainy days (≥ 0.2 mm)	5.2	4.6	8.0	10.9	12.2	11.1	10.3	10.5	10.6	11.4	10.6	7.4	112.8
Average snowy days (≥ 0.2 cm)	12.0	8.7	6.4	2.2	0.0	0.0	0.0	0.0	0.0	0.07	3.2	9.5	42.0
Mean monthly sunshine hours	88.3	110.3	156.3	185.4	229.1	256.2	276.2	241.3	188.0	148.4	83.6	74.7	2,037.6
Percentage possible sunshine	30.5	37.3	42.3	46.1	50.3	55.5	59.1	55.7	50.0	43.3	28.7	26.8	43.8
Source: Environment and Climate Change Canada

Climate data for Toronto Island Airport (1971–2000)
Month	Jan	Feb	Mar	Apr	May	Jun	Jul	Aug	Sep	Oct	Nov	Dec	Year
Mean daily maximum °C (°F)	−1.3 (29.7)	−0.7 (30.7)	3.7 (38.7)	10.1 (50.2)	16.6 (61.9)	21.6 (70.9)	25.1 (77.2)	24.3 (75.7)	19.9 (67.8)	13.0 (55.4)	7.3 (45.1)	1.8 (35.2)	11.8 (53.2)
Daily mean °C (°F)	−4.5 (23.9)	−3.9 (25.0)	0.4 (32.7)	6.4 (43.5)	12.3 (54.1)	17.3 (63.1)	20.7 (69.3)	20.4 (68.7)	16.2 (61.2)	9.7 (49.5)	4.6 (40.3)	−1.3 (29.7)	8.2 (46.8)
Mean daily minimum °C (°F)	−7.8 (18.0)	−7.2 (19.0)	−2.9 (26.8)	2.7 (36.9)	8.0 (46.4)	13.0 (55.4)	16.3 (61.3)	16.6 (61.9)	12.4 (54.3)	6.5 (43.7)	1.8 (35.2)	−4.3 (24.3)	4.6 (40.3)
Average precipitation mm (inches)	50.5 (1.99)	48.5 (1.91)	64.4 (2.54)	69.0 (2.72)	71.6 (2.82)	67.5 (2.66)	67.2 (2.65)	80.1 (3.15)	83.4 (3.28)	64.6 (2.54)	74.6 (2.94)	72.4 (2.85)	813.8 (32.04)
Average rainfall mm (inches)	23.3 (0.92)	24.1 (0.95)	45.5 (1.79)	63.2 (2.49)	71.6 (2.82)	67.5 (2.66)	67.2 (2.65)	80.1 (3.15)	83.4 (3.28)	64.6 (2.54)	69.3 (2.73)	45.1 (1.78)	705.0 (27.76)
Average snowfall cm (inches)	29.5 (11.6)	26.0 (10.2)	18.4 (7.2)	6.0 (2.4)	0.0 (0.0)	0.0 (0.0)	0.0 (0.0)	0.0 (0.0)	0.0 (0.0)	0.0 (0.0)	5.4 (2.1)	27.6 (10.9)	112.8 (44.4)
Average precipitation days (≥ 0.2 mm)	14.3	11.8	12.5	12.0	11.5	11.3	9.8	10.3	10.8	11.9	12.7	14.3	143.1
Average rainy days (≥ 0.2 mm)	4.8	4.8	8.4	10.7	11.5	11.3	9.8	10.3	10.8	11.9	11.1	7.6	113.0
Average snowy days (≥ 0.2 cm)	11.1	8.8	5.8	1.8	0.0	0.0	0.0	0.0	0.0	0.04	2.5	8.9	39.0
Source: Environment and Climate Change Canada

Climate data for Lester B. Pearson International Airport (1961–1990)
Month	Jan	Feb	Mar	Apr	May	Jun	Jul	Aug	Sep	Oct	Nov	Dec	Year
Mean daily maximum °C (°F)	−2.5 (27.5)	−1.6 (29.1)	3.7 (38.7)	11.5 (52.7)	18.4 (65.1)	23.6 (74.5)	26.8 (80.2)	25.5 (77.9)	20.9 (69.6)	14.1 (57.4)	7.2 (45.0)	0.4 (32.7)	12.3 (54.1)
Daily mean °C (°F)	−6.7 (19.9)	−6.1 (21.0)	−0.8 (30.6)	6.0 (42.8)	12.3 (54.1)	17.4 (63.3)	20.5 (68.9)	19.5 (67.1)	15.2 (59.4)	8.9 (48.0)	3.2 (37.8)	−3.5 (25.7)	7.2 (45.0)
Mean daily minimum °C (°F)	−11.1 (12.0)	−10.6 (12.9)	−5.3 (22.5)	0.6 (33.1)	6.1 (43.0)	11.1 (52.0)	14.2 (57.6)	13.4 (56.1)	9.4 (48.9)	3.6 (38.5)	−0.8 (30.6)	−7.4 (18.7)	1.9 (35.4)
Average precipitation mm (inches)	45.6 (1.80)	45.5 (1.79)	56.9 (2.24)	64.0 (2.52)	66.0 (2.60)	68.9 (2.71)	76.6 (3.02)	84.2 (3.31)	74.2 (2.92)	63.0 (2.48)	70.3 (2.77)	65.5 (2.58)	780.8 (30.74)
Average rainfall mm (inches)	18.5 (0.73)	20.8 (0.82)	35.1 (1.38)	56.0 (2.20)	65.8 (2.59)	68.9 (2.71)	76.6 (3.02)	84.2 (3.31)	74.2 (2.92)	62.0 (2.44)	64.3 (2.53)	38.3 (1.51)	664.7 (26.17)
Average snowfall cm (inches)	32.3 (12.7)	25.9 (10.2)	19.9 (7.8)	7.3 (2.9)	0.1 (0.0)	0.0 (0.0)	0.0 (0.0)	0.0 (0.0)	0.0 (0.0)	1.1 (0.4)	6.4 (2.5)	31.1 (12.2)	124.2 (48.9)
Average precipitation days (≥ 0.2 mm)	14	12	13	12	11	11	10	11	10	12	13	15	141
Average rainy days (≥ 0.2 mm)	4	4	8	10	11	11	10	11	10	11	11	7	107
Average snowy days (≥ 0.2 cm)	12	10	7	3	0	0	0	0	0	0	4	11	47
Average relative humidity (%) (at 6:00)	82	82	83	81	81	84	86	90	90	88	86	85	85
Source: Environment and Climate Change Canada

Climate data for Toronto (The Annex) 1961–1990
Month	Jan	Feb	Mar	Apr	May	Jun	Jul	Aug	Sep	Oct	Nov	Dec	Year
Mean daily maximum °C (°F)	−1.3 (29.7)	−0.6 (30.9)	4.4 (39.9)	11.5 (52.7)	18.2 (64.8)	23.5 (74.3)	26.5 (79.7)	25.3 (77.5)	20.9 (69.6)	14.2 (57.6)	7.7 (45.9)	1.4 (34.5)	12.6 (54.7)
Daily mean °C (°F)	−4.5 (23.9)	−3.8 (25.2)	1.0 (33.8)	7.5 (45.5)	13.8 (56.8)	18.9 (66.0)	22.1 (71.8)	21.1 (70.0)	16.9 (62.4)	10.7 (51.3)	4.9 (40.8)	−1.5 (29.3)	8.9 (48.0)
Mean daily minimum °C (°F)	−7.9 (17.8)	−7.2 (19.0)	−2.4 (27.7)	3.5 (38.3)	9.3 (48.7)	14.3 (57.7)	17.6 (63.7)	16.9 (62.4)	13.0 (55.4)	7.2 (45.0)	2.1 (35.8)	−4.4 (24.1)	5.2 (41.4)
Average precipitation mm (inches)	55.2 (2.17)	52.6 (2.07)	65.2 (2.57)	65.4 (2.57)	68.0 (2.68)	67.0 (2.64)	71.0 (2.80)	82.5 (3.25)	76.2 (3.00)	63.3 (2.49)	76.1 (3.00)	76.5 (3.01)	818.9 (32.24)
Average rainfall mm (inches)	22.7 (0.89)	25.2 (0.99)	41.0 (1.61)	58.1 (2.29)	67.8 (2.67)	67.0 (2.64)	71.0 (2.80)	82.5 (3.25)	76.2 (3.00)	62.7 (2.47)	70.2 (2.76)	44.8 (1.76)	689.3 (27.14)
Average snowfall cm (inches)	35.5 (14.0)	28.6 (11.3)	22.7 (8.9)	7.3 (2.9)	0.1 (0.0)	0.0 (0.0)	0.0 (0.0)	0.0 (0.0)	0.0 (0.0)	0.5 (0.2)	6.1 (2.4)	34.1 (13.4)	135.0 (53.1)
Average precipitation days (≥ 0.2 mm)	14	12	12	12	12	11	10	10	10	11	13	15	139
Average rainy days (≥ 0.2 mm)	4	4	8	11	12	11	10	10	10	11	11	7	108
Average snowy days (≥ 0.2 cm)	11	9	6	2	0	0	0	0	0	0	3	10	40
Mean monthly sunshine hours	95.5	112.6	150.5	187.7	229.7	254.9	278.0	244.0	184.7	145.7	82.3	72.6	2,038.3
Source: Environment and Climate Change Canada

Climate data for Toronto Island Airport (1961–1990)
Month	Jan	Feb	Mar	Apr	May	Jun	Jul	Aug	Sep	Oct	Nov	Dec	Year
Mean daily maximum °C (°F)	−1.4 (29.5)	−0.9 (30.4)	3.6 (38.5)	10.0 (50.0)	16.2 (61.2)	21.7 (71.1)	25.0 (77.0)	24.2 (75.6)	20.0 (68.0)	13.4 (56.1)	7.4 (45.3)	1.4 (34.5)	11.7 (53.1)
Daily mean °C (°F)	−4.6 (23.7)	−4.1 (24.6)	0.5 (32.9)	6.3 (43.3)	12.0 (53.6)	17.2 (63.0)	20.6 (69.1)	20.3 (68.5)	16.3 (61.3)	10.1 (50.2)	4.7 (40.5)	−1.5 (29.3)	8.1 (46.6)
Mean daily minimum °C (°F)	−7.9 (17.8)	−7.4 (18.7)	−2.8 (27.0)	2.5 (36.5)	7.7 (45.9)	12.8 (55.0)	16.2 (61.2)	16.4 (61.5)	12.6 (54.7)	6.8 (44.2)	1.9 (35.4)	−4.5 (23.9)	4.5 (40.1)
Average precipitation mm (inches)	51.3 (2.02)	49.5 (1.95)	59.7 (2.35)	62.8 (2.47)	66.8 (2.63)	68.0 (2.68)	68.5 (2.70)	79.9 (3.15)	75.5 (2.97)	60.5 (2.38)	71.2 (2.80)	73.2 (2.88)	786.8 (30.98)
Average rainfall mm (inches)	22.5 (0.89)	25.5 (1.00)	40.2 (1.58)	57.0 (2.24)	66.8 (2.63)	68.0 (2.68)	68.5 (2.70)	79.9 (3.15)	75.5 (2.97)	60.3 (2.37)	66.6 (2.62)	44.8 (1.76)	675.5 (26.59)
Average snowfall cm (inches)	29.3 (11.5)	24.7 (9.7)	19.1 (7.5)	5.8 (2.3)	0.0 (0.0)	0.0 (0.0)	0.0 (0.0)	0.0 (0.0)	0.0 (0.0)	0.2 (0.1)	4.8 (1.9)	27.3 (10.7)	111.2 (43.8)
Average precipitation days (≥ 0.2 mm)	14	11	11	11	11	11	9	10	10	11	12	14	134
Average rainy days (≥ 0.2 mm)	4	4	7	10	11	11	9	10	10	11	11	7	105
Average snowy days (≥ 0.2 cm)	11	8	6	2	0	0	0	0	0	0	2	9	38
Source: Environment and Climate Change Canada

== Topography ==
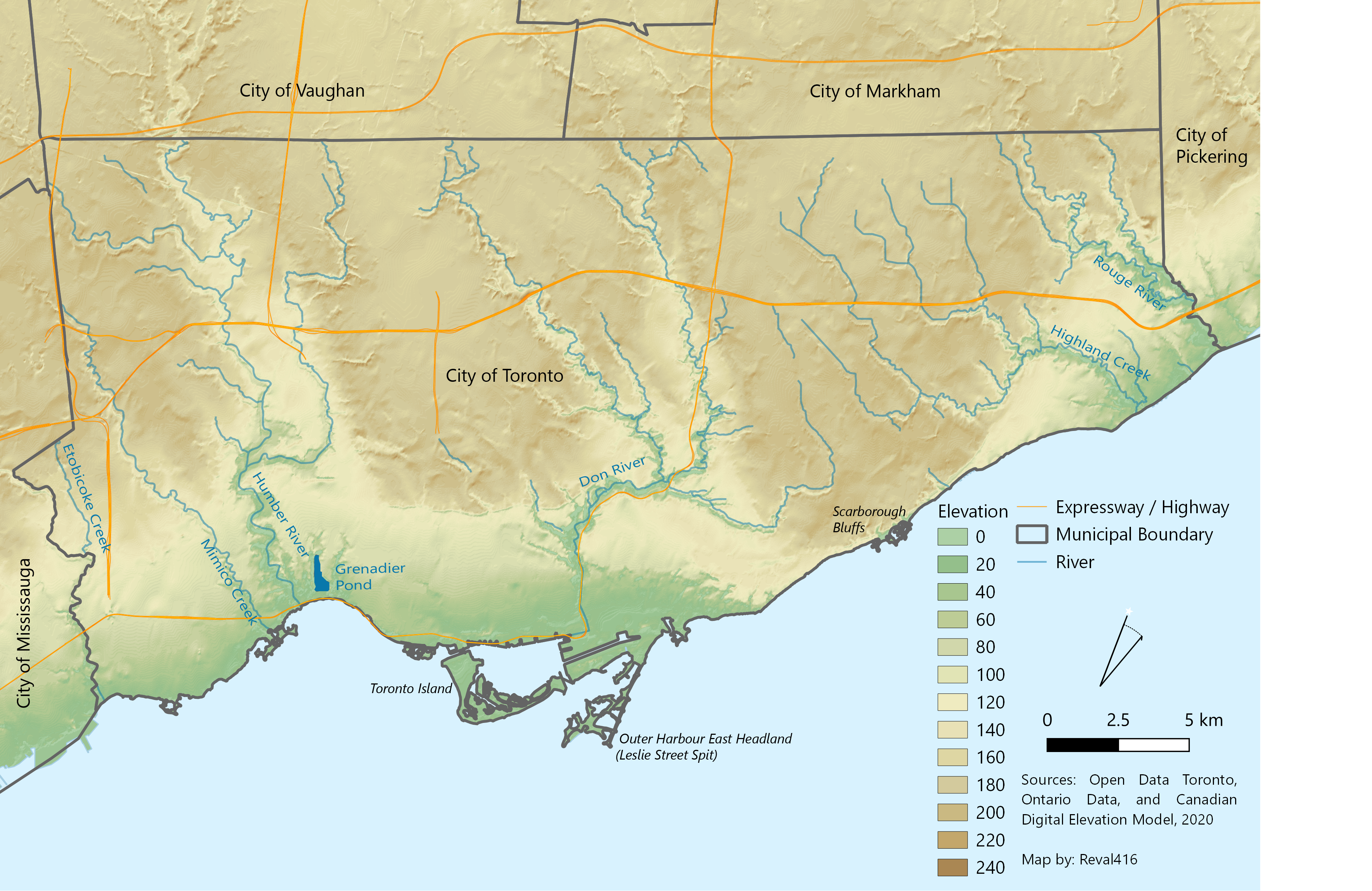
Topographic map of Toronto with grid north at the top

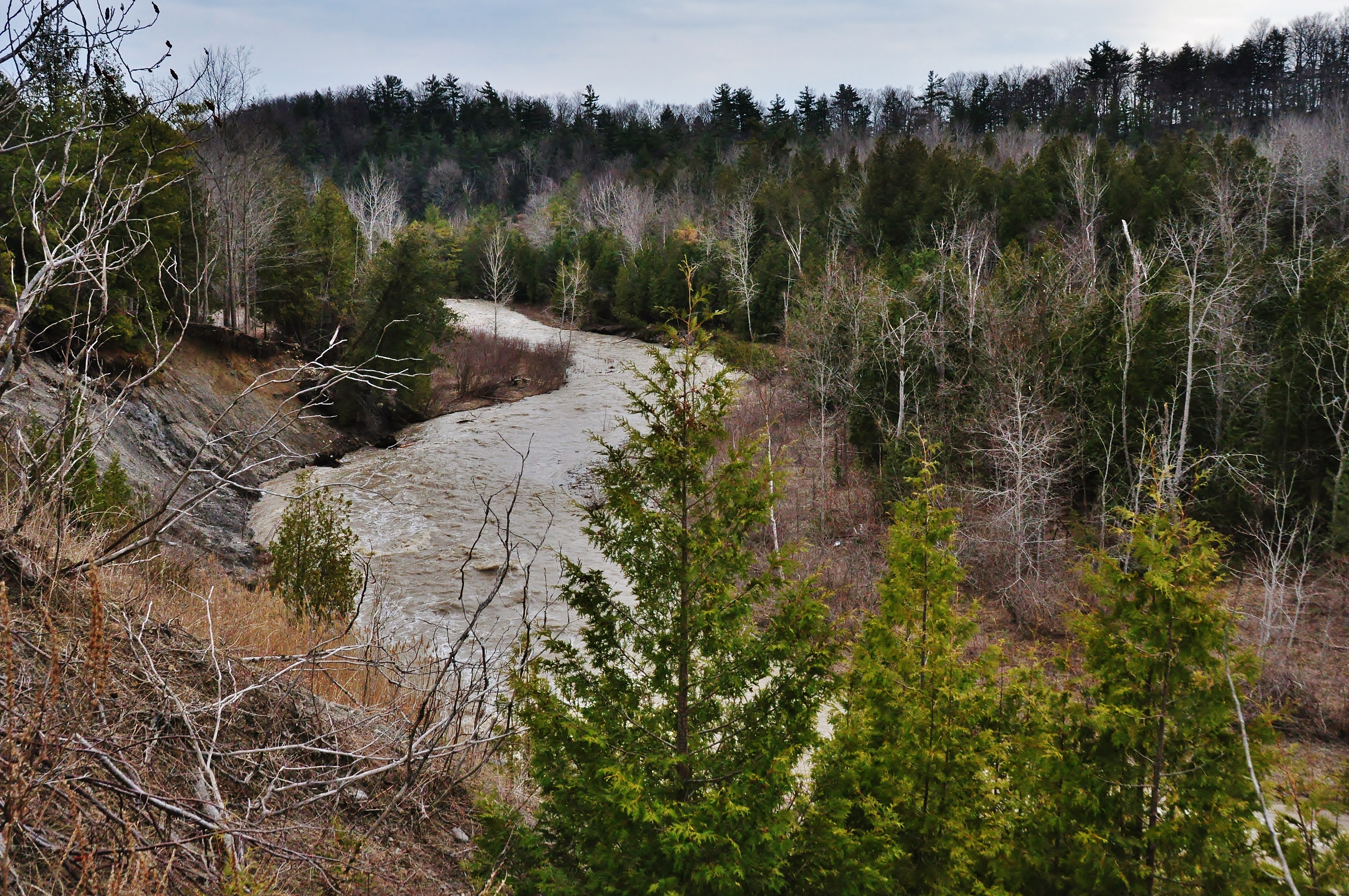
The Rouge River and its valley at Rouge National Urban Park in 2014. The Rouge Valley is one of many hills and valleys in the area that was carved out during the Last Glacial Period.

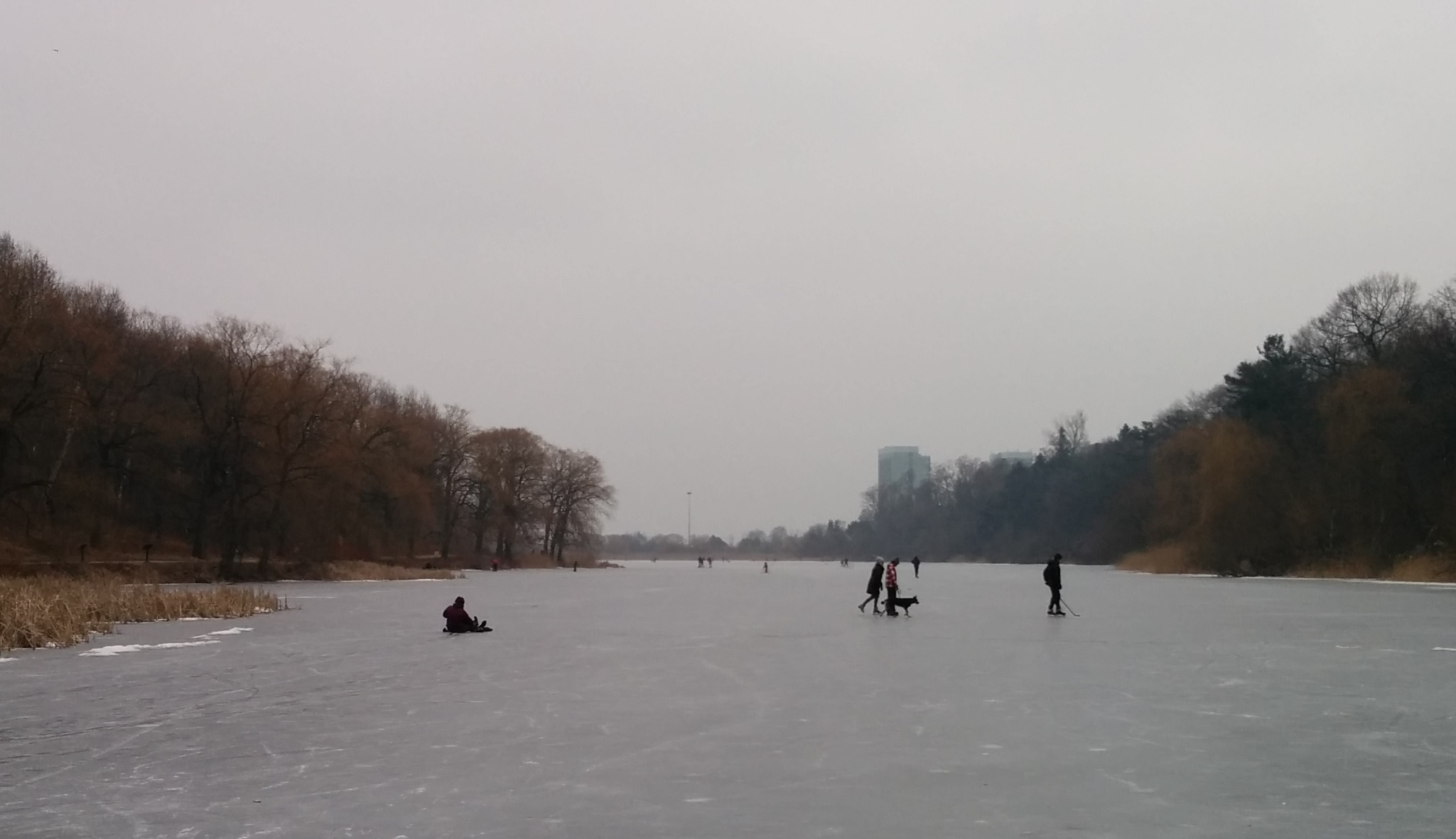
Grenadier Pond in High Park frozen over in January 2015

Toronto has numerous hills and valleys that were carved out during the last Ice Age. The ravines are largely undeveloped, primarily as the result of Hurricane Hazel in 1954 and subsequent laws prohibiting development on the floodplains.

A significant topographical feature is the old shoreline of the Glacial Lake Iroquois, known as the Iroquois Plain. The plain consists mostly of sand deposits and eroded shale and gently slopes about 3–4 km (1.9–2.5 mi) north from Lake Ontario. Davenport Road mostly runs along the bottom of the old shoreline between Dupont Street to the east and Symington Avenue. The Iroquois Plain joins Lake Ontario at the Scarborough Bluffs where erosion and the currents of Lake Ontario have carried sand deposits into Toronto Harbour to form the Toronto Islands. Above the Iroquois Plain, the topography includes two features: the South Slope and the Peel Plain. The South Slope is the southern part of an interlobular moraine the Oak Ridges Moraine. The South Slope has a gentle slope as well and experiences relatively high runoff as water infiltration is relatively low. The Peel Plain is mostly clay and generally flatter than the South Slope. Water infiltration is also low. Historically, the Peel Plain and South Slope were considered to be high-quality agricultural lands, unlike the Iroquois Plain, which is very sandy. These areas are now heavily urbanized.

Both Dufferin Street and Caledonia Road between Davenport Road and Eglinton Avenue, in the York district, run across numerous steep hills and valleys and the neighbourhood in this area is named Fairbank. Fairbank and Silverthorn to the west have often been compared with the many hills that make up San Francisco. However, parts of the hills and valleys are slightly levelled for GO Transit's Barrie line that runs through this area.

Vaughan Road runs parallel to the buried Castle Frank Brook to the northeast.

Line 5 Eglinton's Avenue station is the deepest station in the Toronto subway system as it is under a hill at 32 metres (105 ft) below the surface.

The Don River is categorized as an underfit river, given that the river in its current state is too small for its much wider and deeper valley. The same is true for the Humber River, the Rouge River, and the various smaller waterways of Toronto.

Grenadier Pond at the western edge of High Park is the largest body of water fully within Toronto's city limits. During the winter, it becomes a natural skating rink. The ancient underground Laurentian River System has its mouth under High Park. Spring Road on the eastern side of High Park follows this underground river.

== See also ==
- Environmental issues in Toronto
- Fauna of Toronto
- List of parks in Toronto
- Native trees in Toronto
- Toronto waterway system
