= Greater Toronto Bioregion =

Ecosystem of the greater Toronto area

Coordinates: 43°38′33″N 79°23′14″W

The Greater Toronto Bioregion represents a unique ecosystem that co-exists with the urban sprawl of the Greater Toronto Area. It is also part of the Oak Ridges Moraine system.
