= Fauna of Toronto =

Species in the Ontario, Canada city

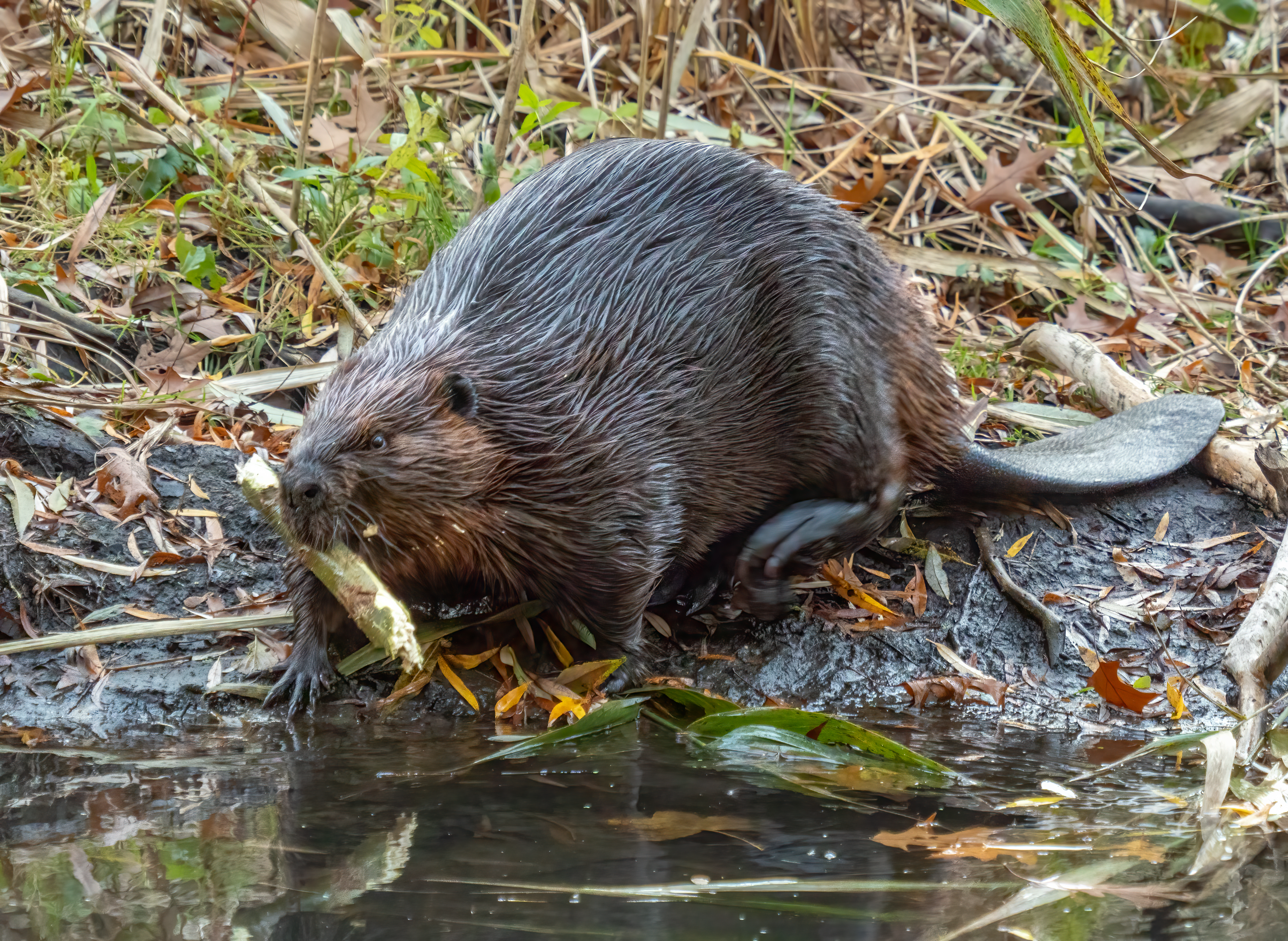
A beaver, a native species to the region, in High Park, Toronto. The beaver is a national symbol of Canada and is featured on the coat of arms of Toronto.

The fauna of Toronto include a variety of different species situated within the city limits. Toronto contains a mosaic of ecosystems that includes forests, rivers, streams, and wetlands, which allows it to support a large variety of fauna. Approximately 87 to 90 per cent of the city's indigenous flora and fauna inhabit the city reside within the Toronto ravine system. The city's ravine system, creeks and rivers are wildlife corridors that allow animals to travel from one area of the city to another. Although most animals in Toronto reside within the ravine system, several animals also live in the city's urban environment and parks.

The City of Toronto reports there are 24 species of amphibians and reptiles, 38 species of mammals, (Note: The following does not include humans, animals held in captivity (like the Toronto Zoo), or domesticated animals (such as pets and livestock).) over 410 bird species, and a large number of insect genera in the city. There are also over 100 species of fish reported within the Greater Toronto Area.

Toronto was also in the historic range of several other animals, although the city's urban growth in the 19th century and early 20th century led to these species' natural range to recede beyond the city limits.

== Vertebrates ==
=== Amphibians and reptiles ===
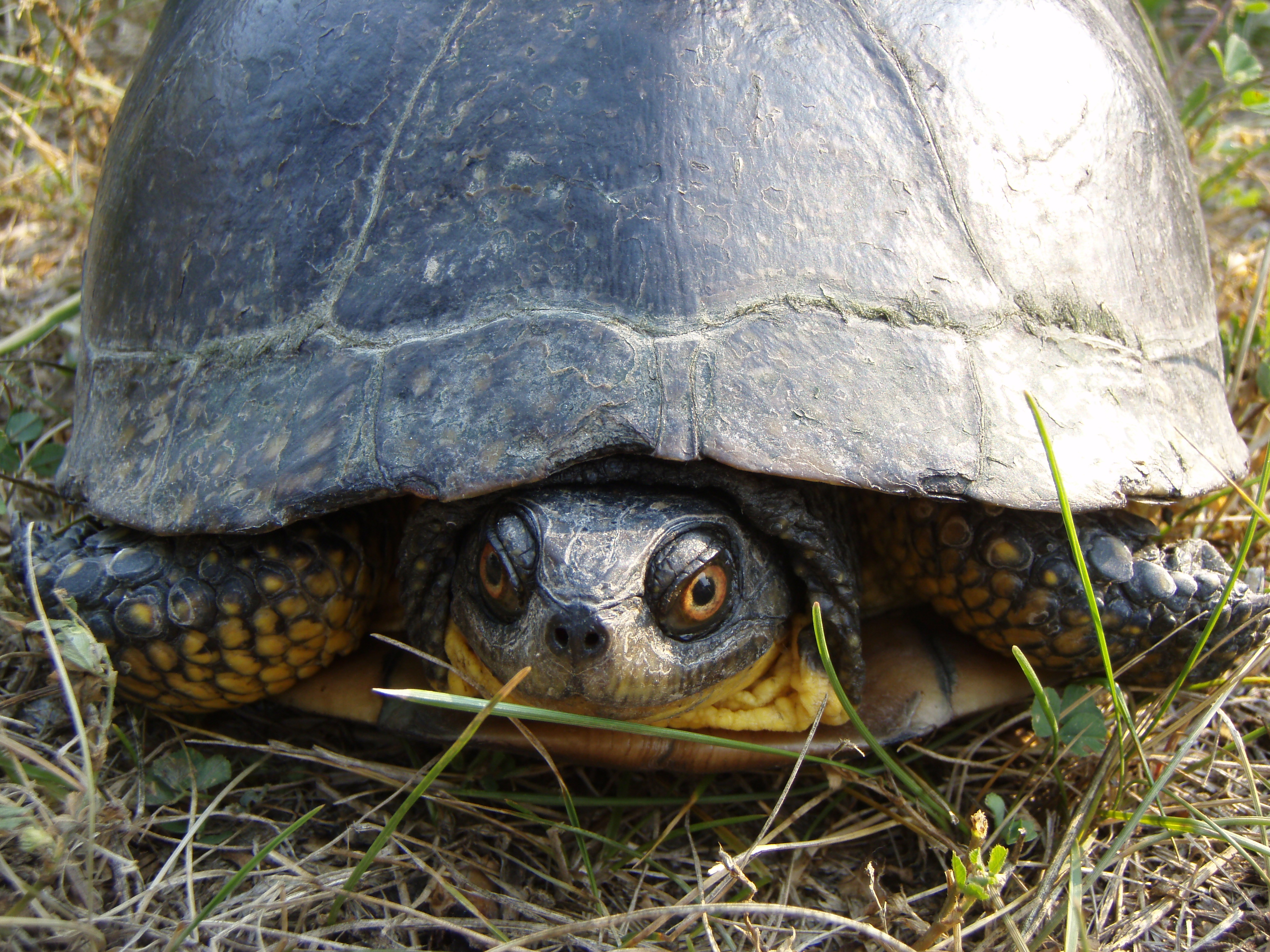
Blanding's turtles is one of several endangered species that inhabit the city.

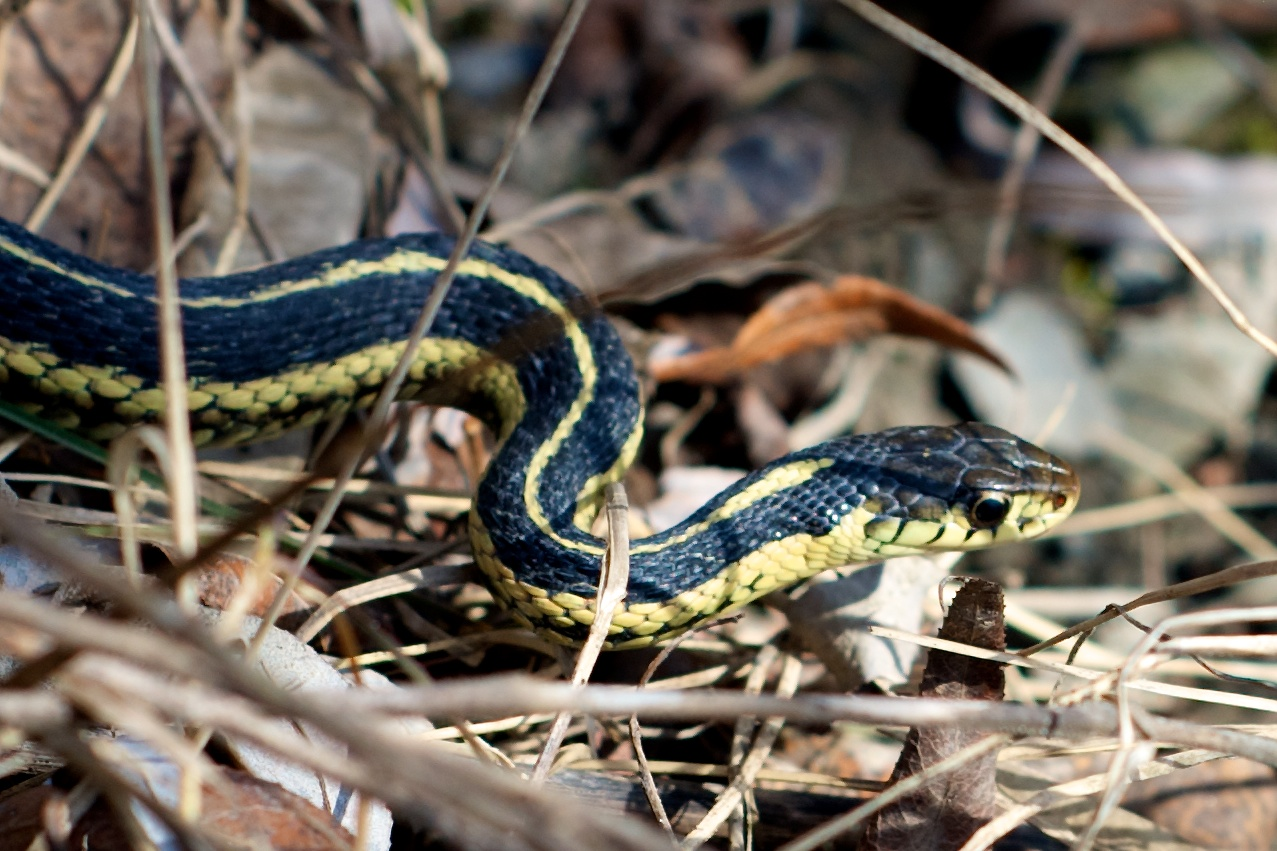
An Eastern garter snake in the Toronto ravine system

There are 24 species of amphibians and reptiles that are considered native species within the city limits of Toronto, with most populations concentrated in the wetlands found in the city. Six of these native species were listed under the federal Species at Risk Act. The following amphibian and reptile species (sorted by family) may be found throughout the City of Toronto:

- Chelydridae
  - Common snapping turtle
- Colubridae
  - Common garter snake
  - De Kay's snake
  - Milksnake
  - Northern redbelly snake
  - Northern water snake
  - Smooth green snake
- Hylidae
  - Grey tree frog
  - Spring peeper
  - Western chorus frog
- Kinosternidae
  - Eastern musk turtle
- Lungless salamander
  - Eastern red-backed salamander
- Mole salamander
  - Spotted salamander
- Pond turtle
  - Blanding's turtle
  - Midland painted turtle
  - Northern map turtle
  - Pond slider (Note: Non-native species.)
  - Spotted turtle
  - Wood turtle
- Proteidae
  - Common mudpuppy
- True frog
  - American bullfrog
  - Green frog
  - Northern leopard frog
  - Wood frog
- True salamander
  - Eastern newt
- True toad
  - American toad

=== Birds ===
At least 195 bird species were confirmed to breed in the area, with a total of 410 species of birds recorded in the Greater Toronto Area (either breeding, in migration, or vagrant). A number of birds pass through the Toronto while migrating, with the city being situated around where the Atlantic and the Mississippi migratory flyways converge.

The following bird species (sorted by family) have been spotted in the City of Toronto, and Greater Toronto:

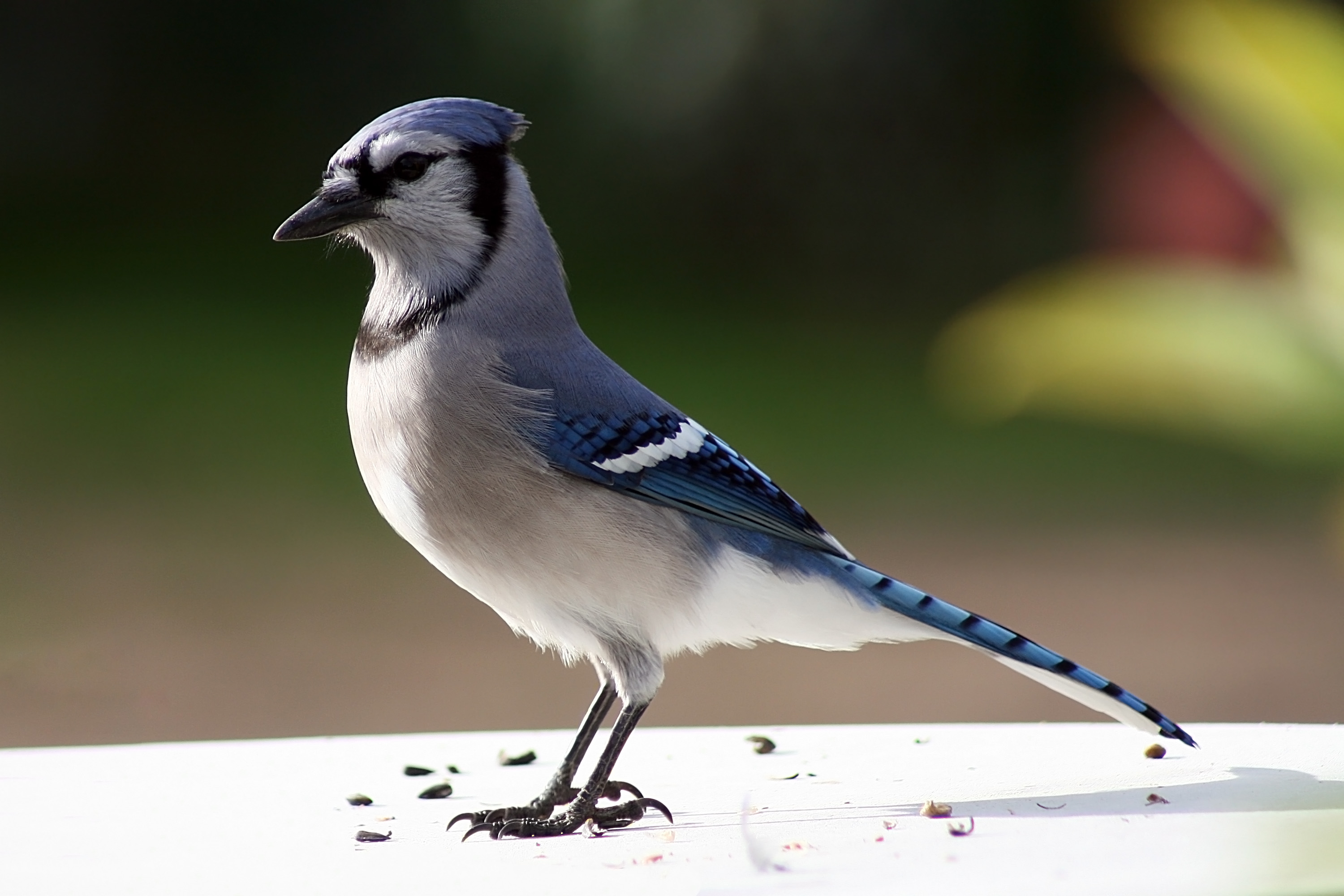
Blue jays may be seen throughout the city. Toronto's Major League Baseball team is named after the bird.

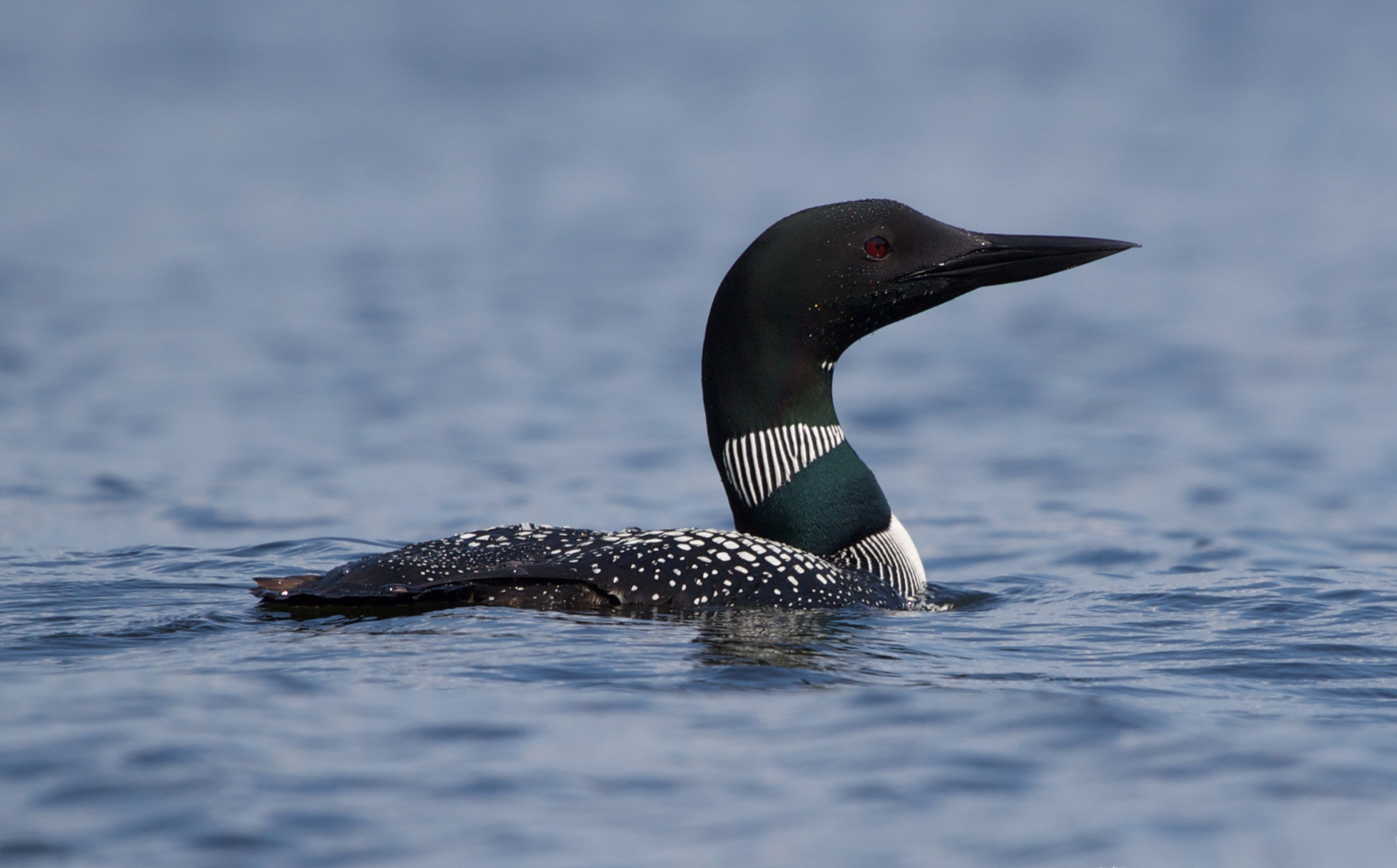
The common loon is the provincial bird of Ontario, and a bird species that breeds within Greater Toronto.

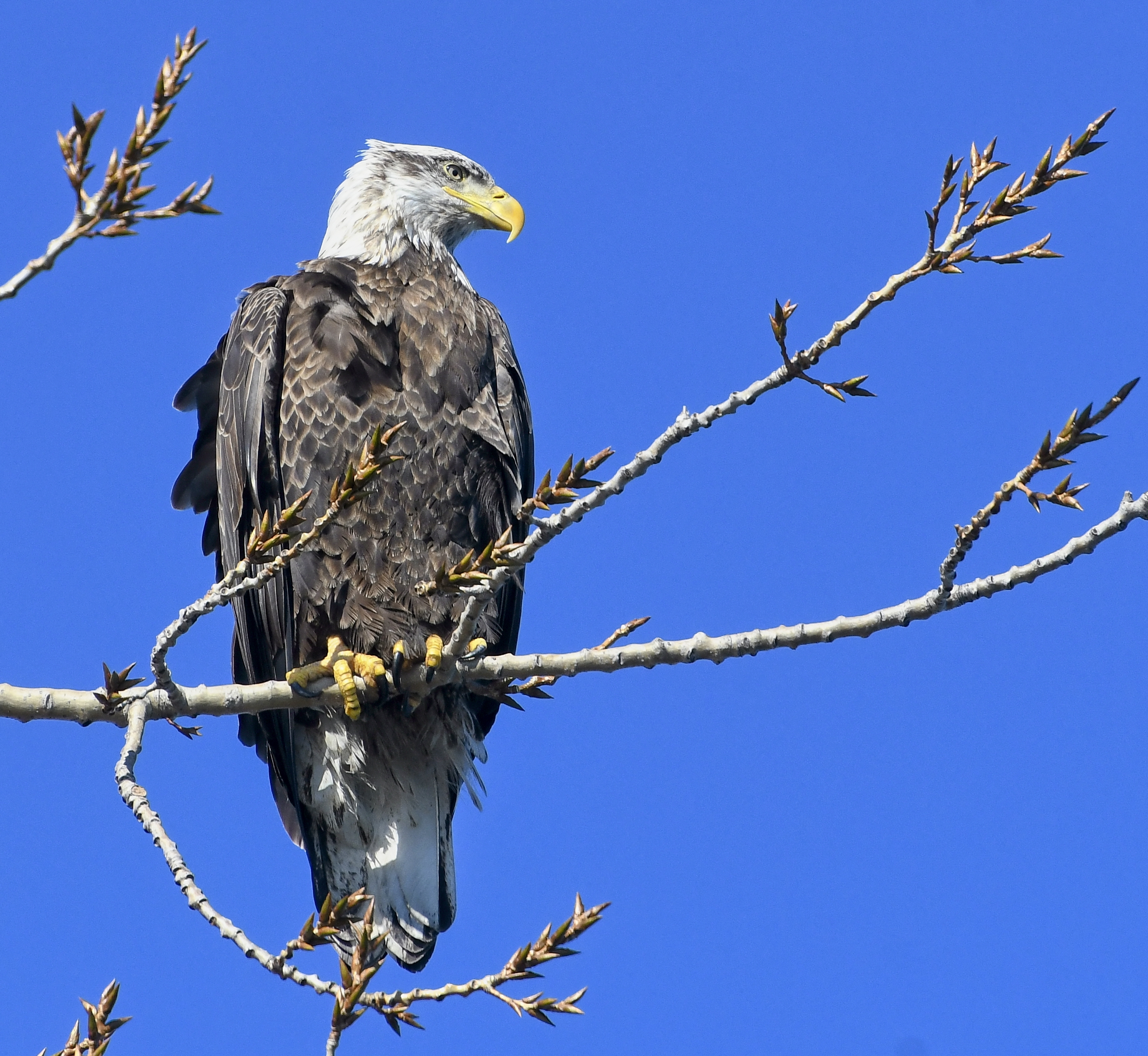
A bald eagle at Humber Bay Park

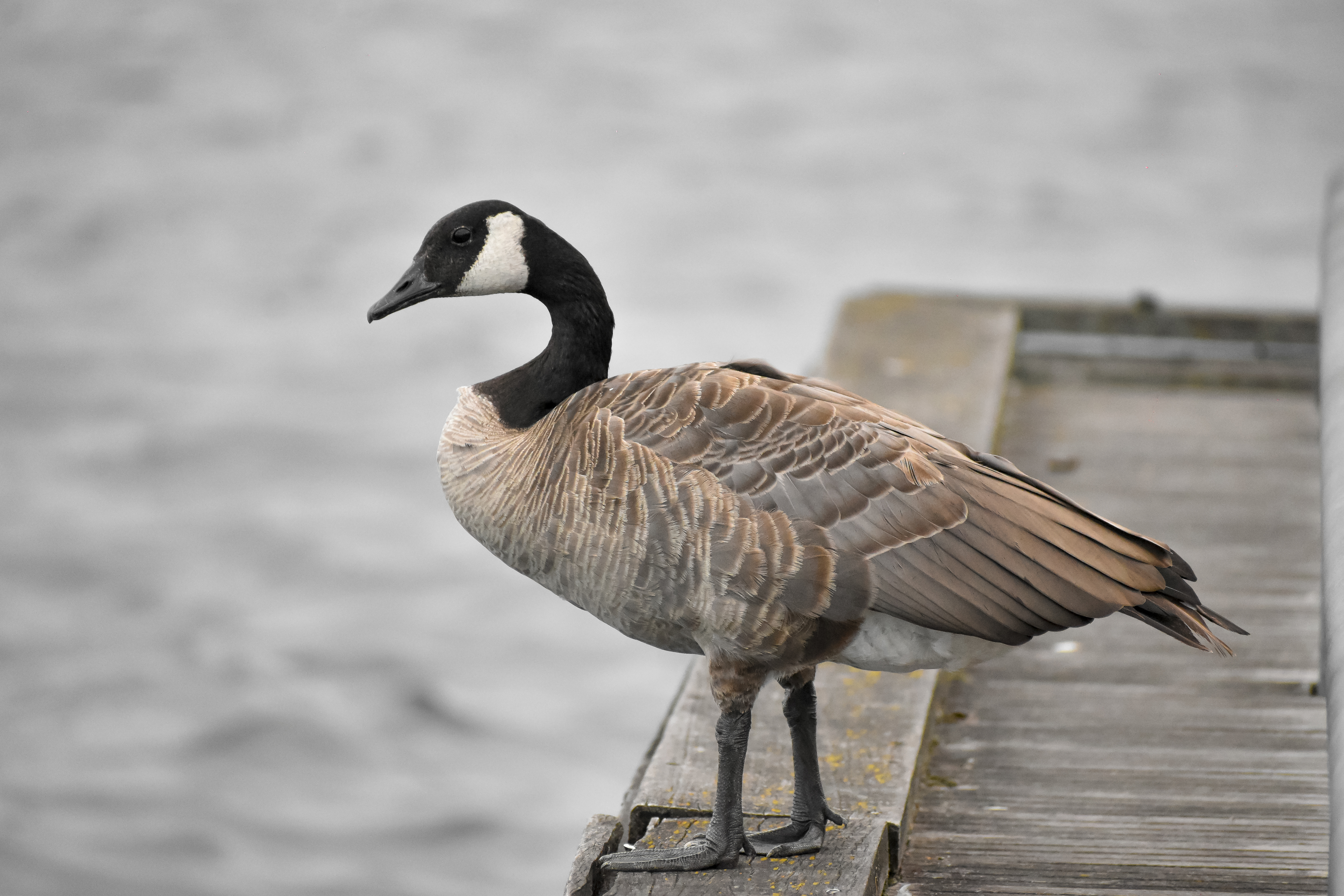
A Canada goose along the Harbourfront of Toronto

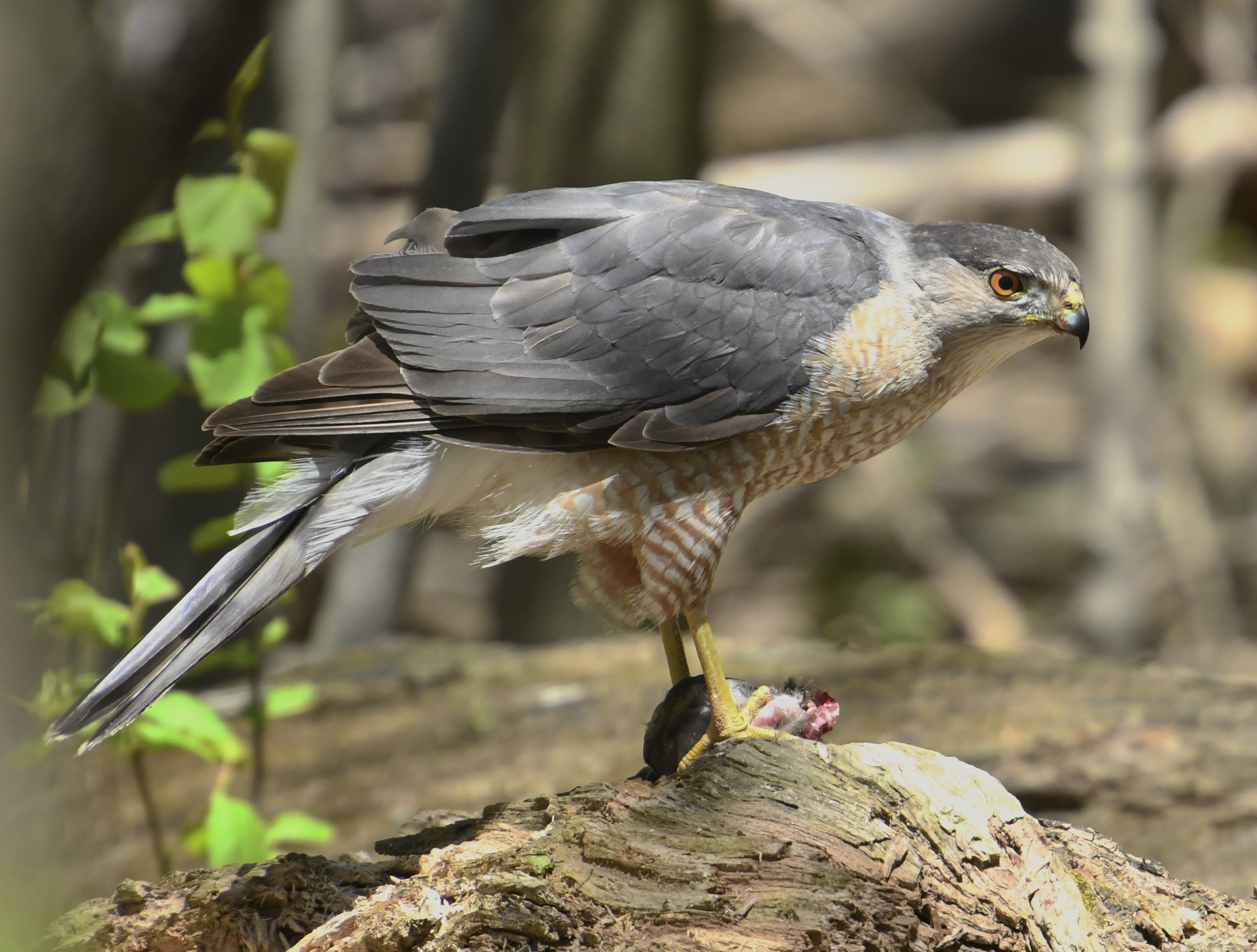
A Cooper's hawk at Colonel Samuel Smith Park

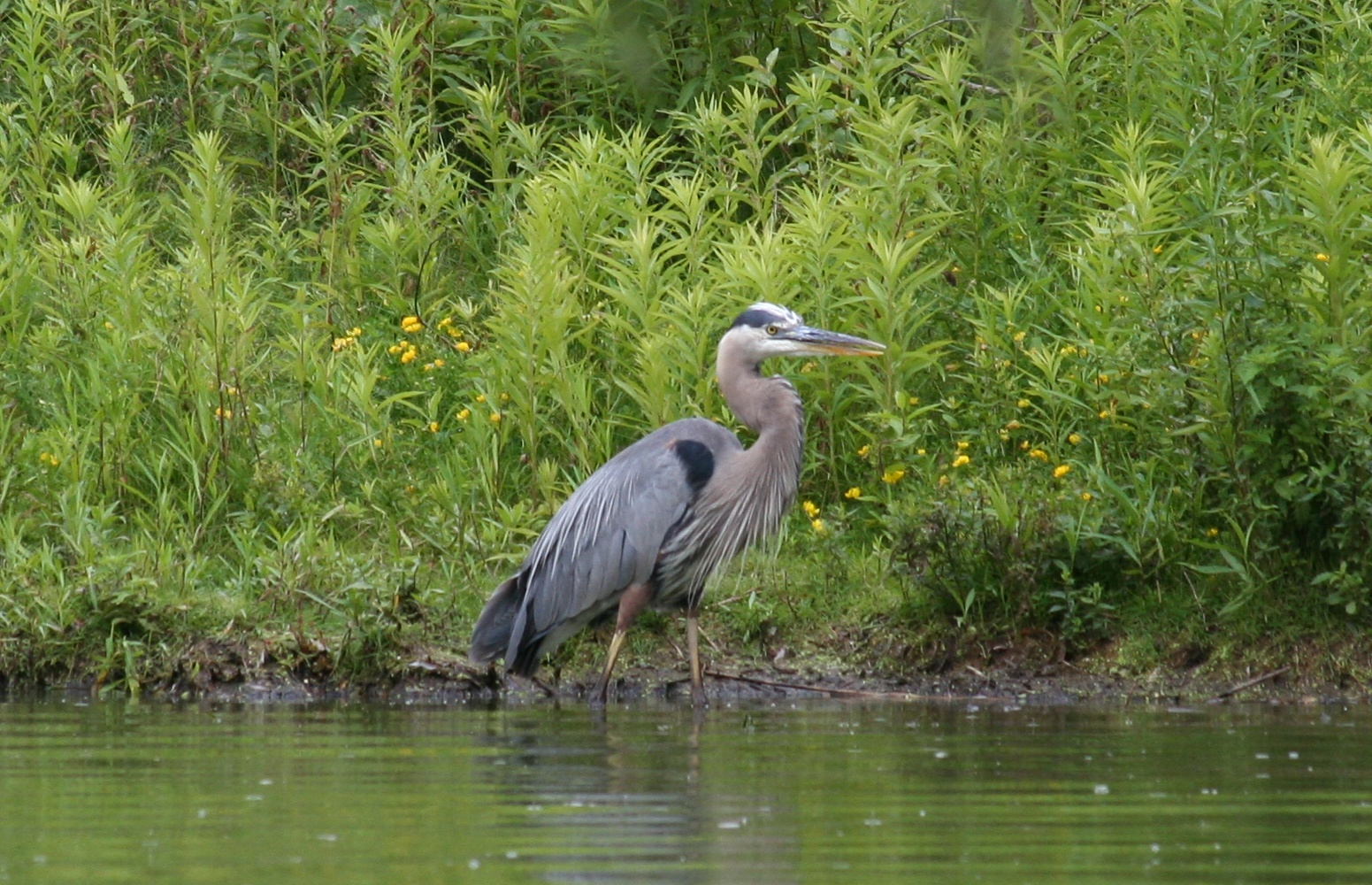
A great blue heron wading in Grenadier Pond at High Park

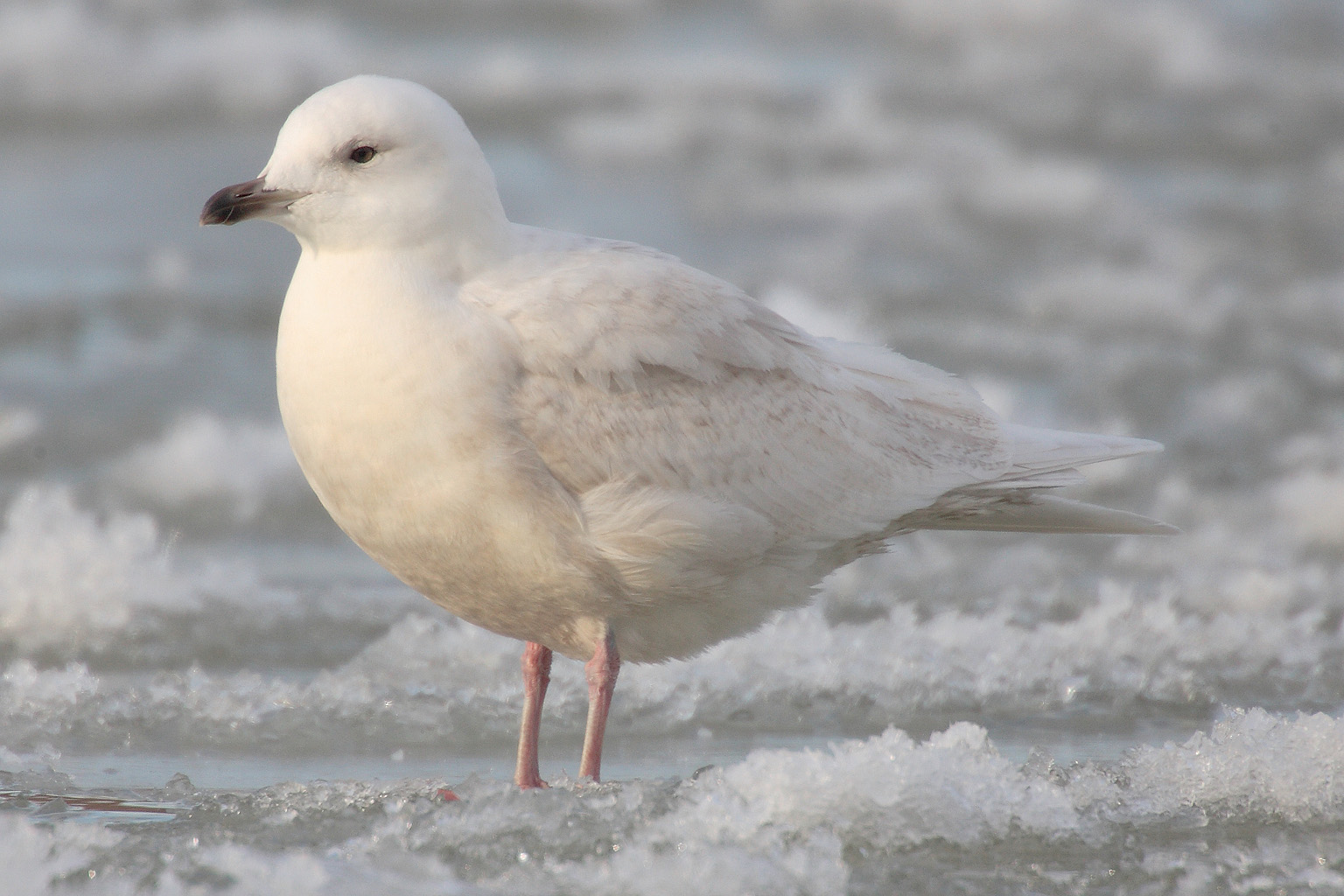
An Iceland gull at the Scarborough Bluffs. The gull is one of 11 species from the genus Larus that has been recorded in the city.

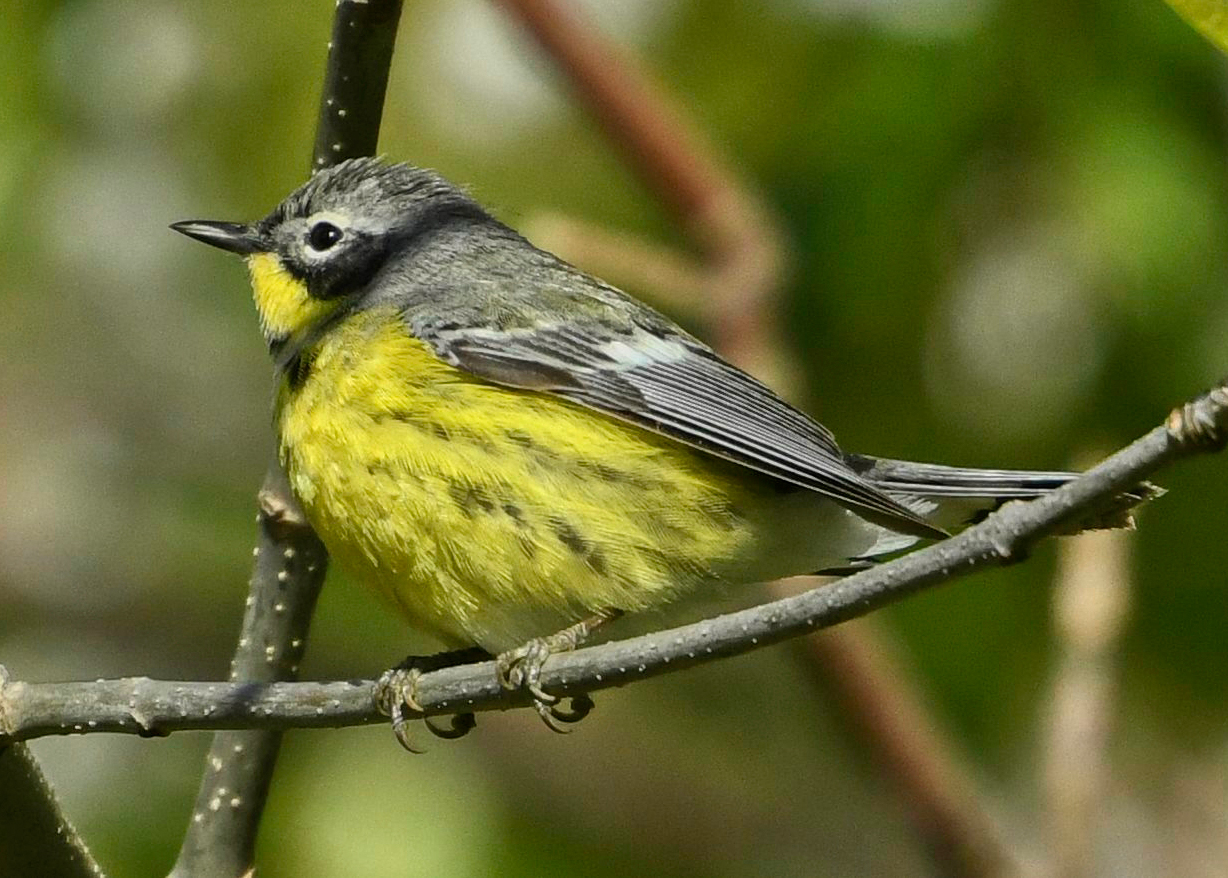
A magnolia warbler in Colonel Samuel Smith Park. The magnolia warbler is one of 52 New World warblers recorded in the city.

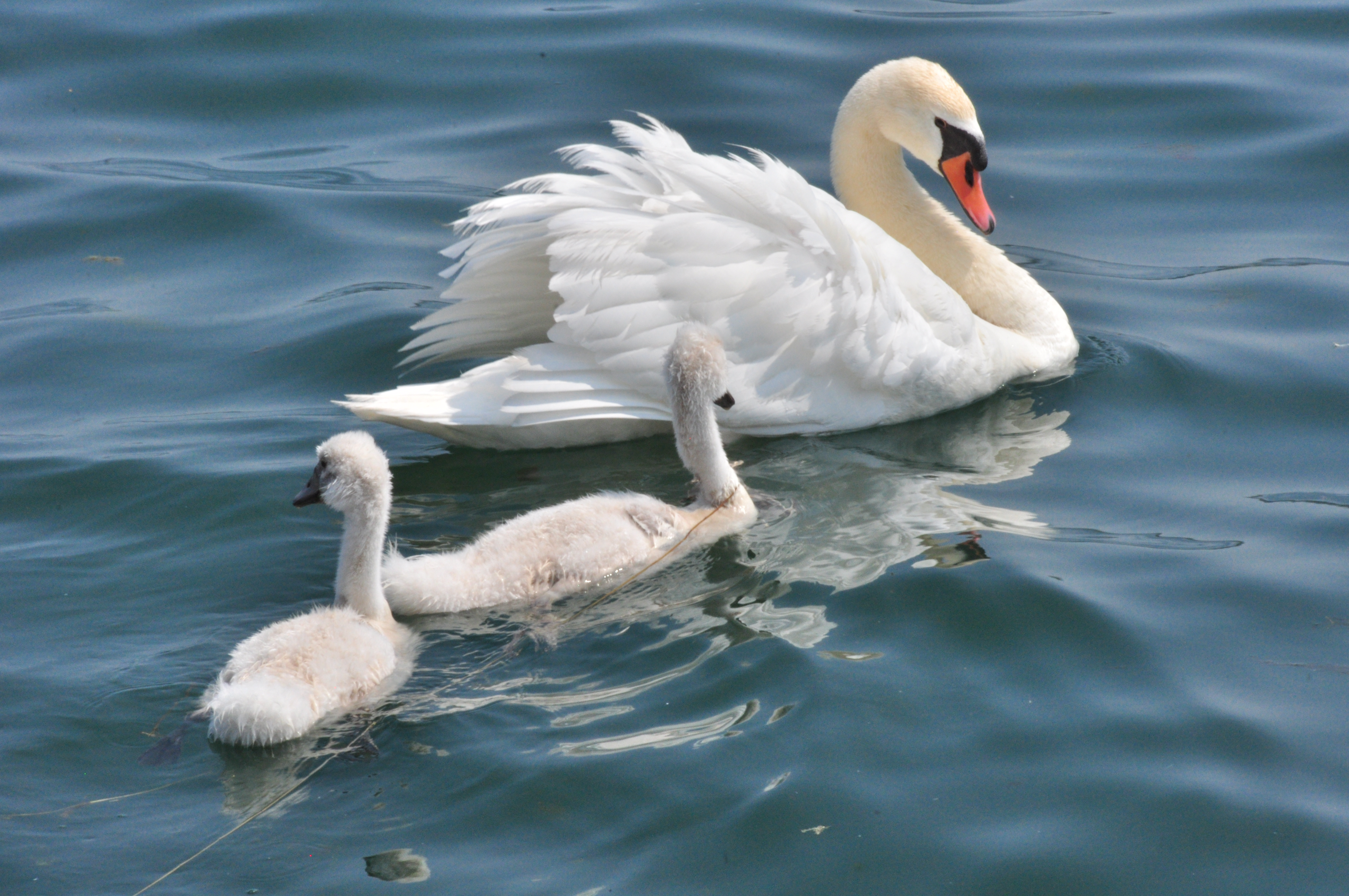
Introduced to the local ecosystem in the 19th century, mute swans are seen as an invasive species in Toronto. Their population requires regular management from the TRCA.

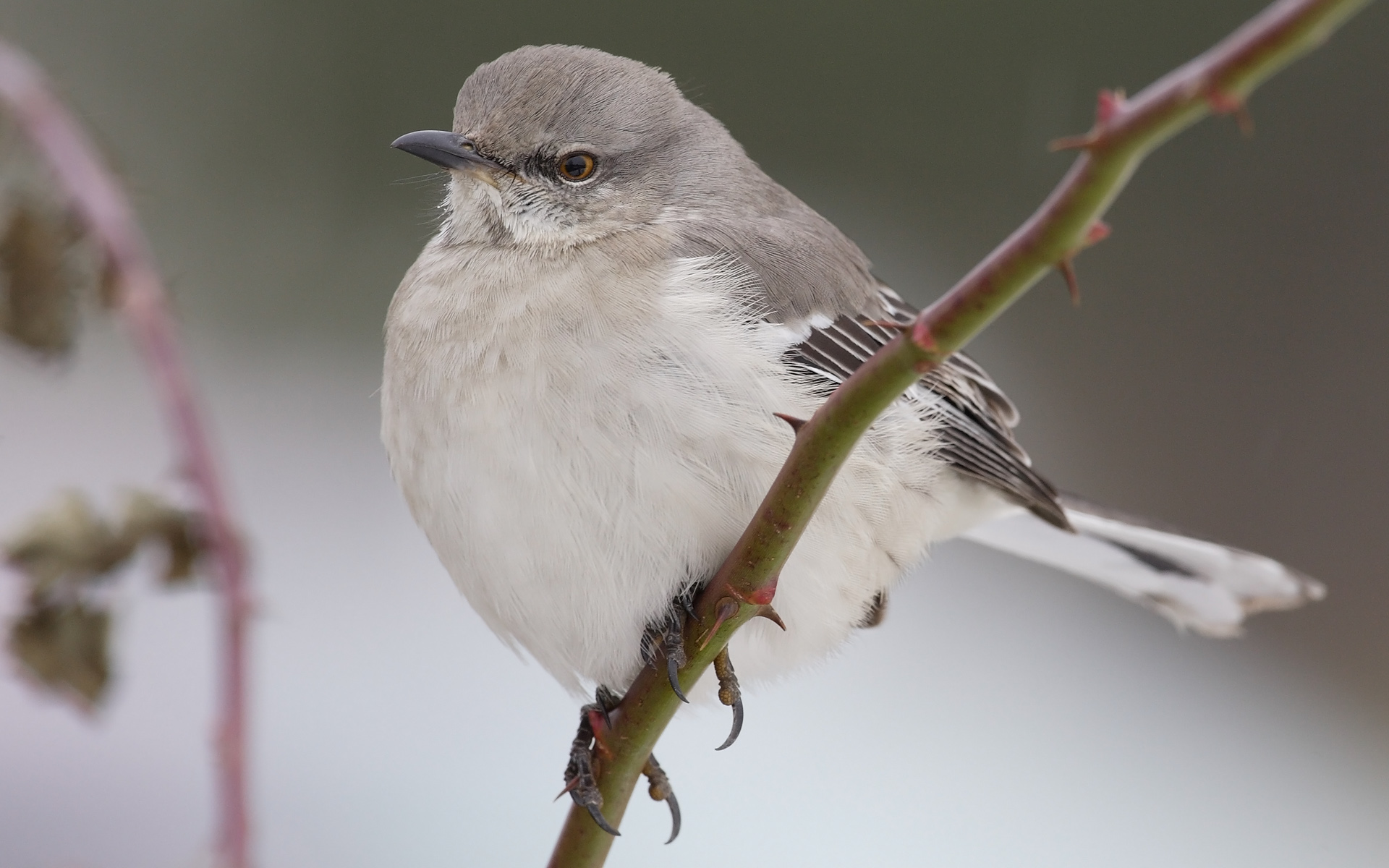
A northern mockingbird perched on a branch at Humber Bay Park West.

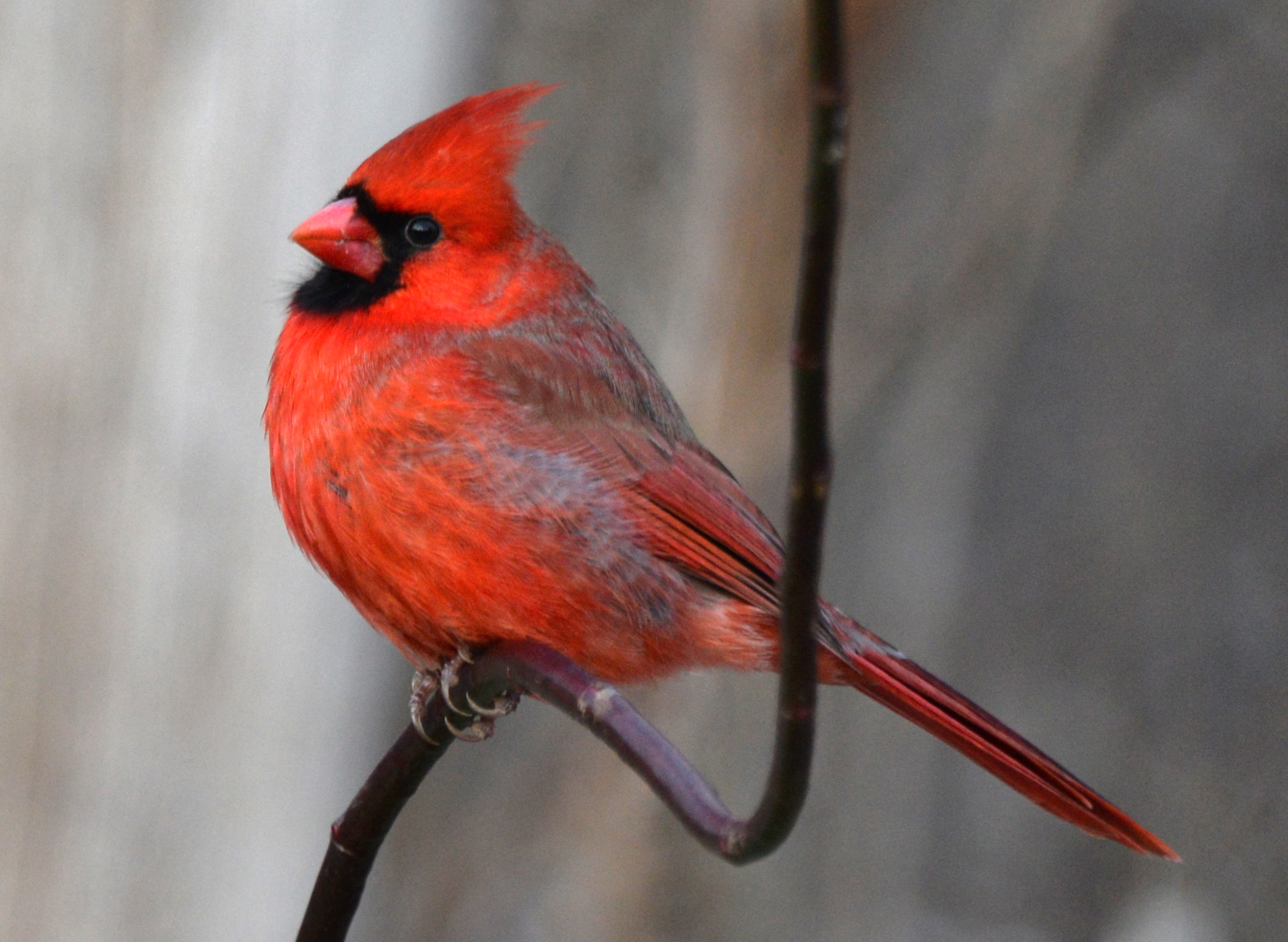
A northern cardinal at Lambton Woods Park in Toronto.

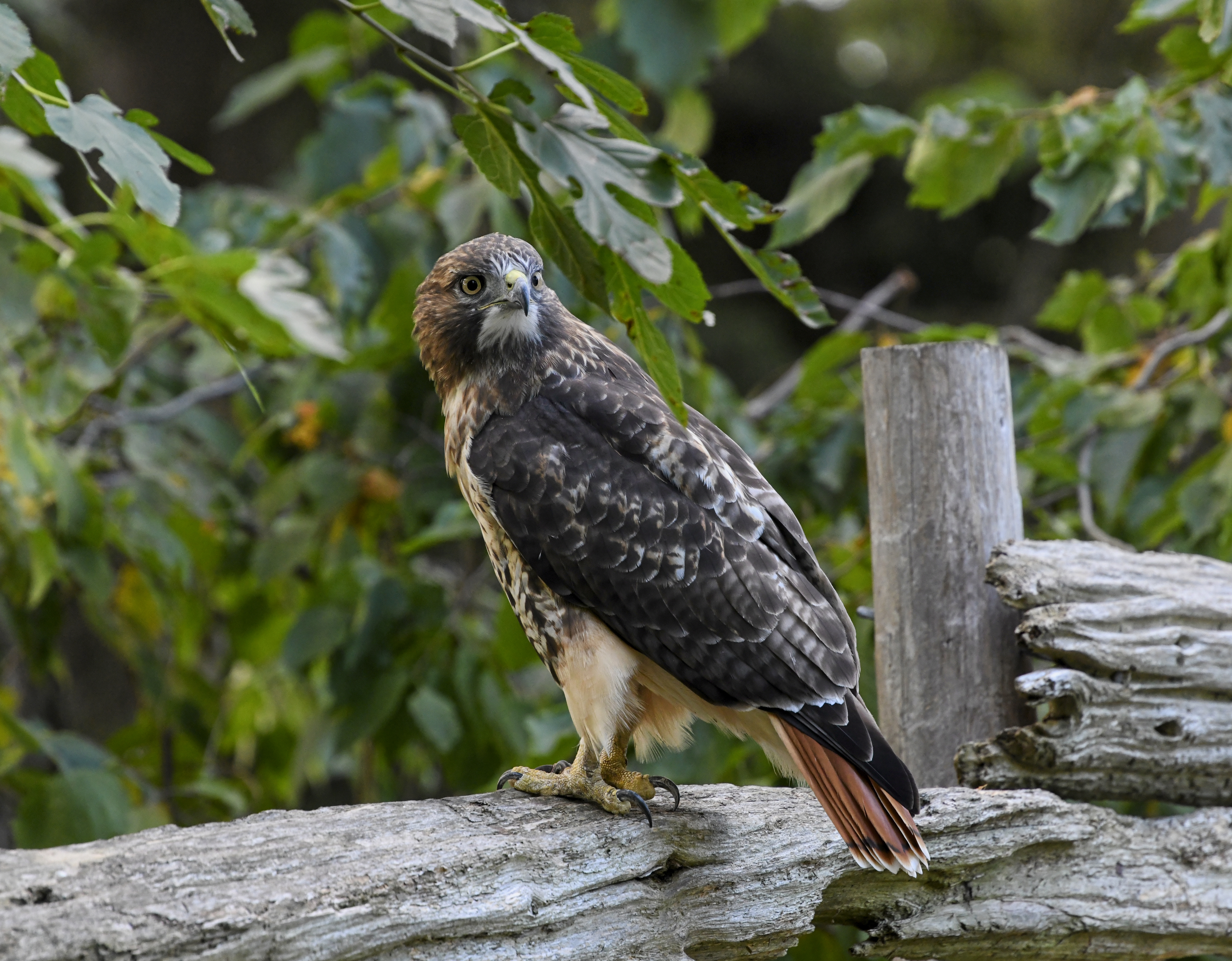
A red-tailed hawk at High Park. The hawk is one of five species of the genus Buteo spotted in the city.

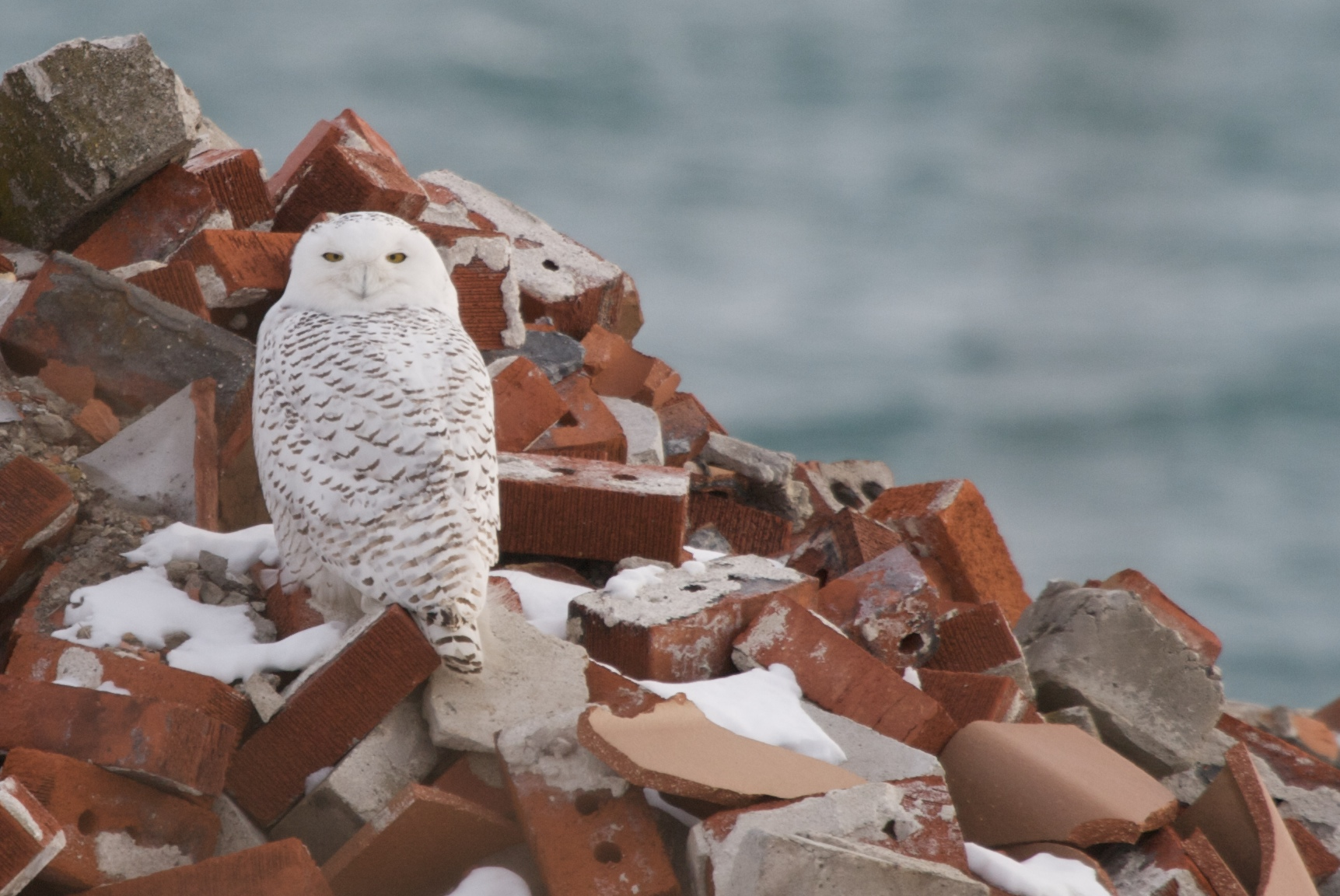
A snowy owl at the Leslie Street Spit. Snowy owls winter throughout southern Canada, including Toronto.

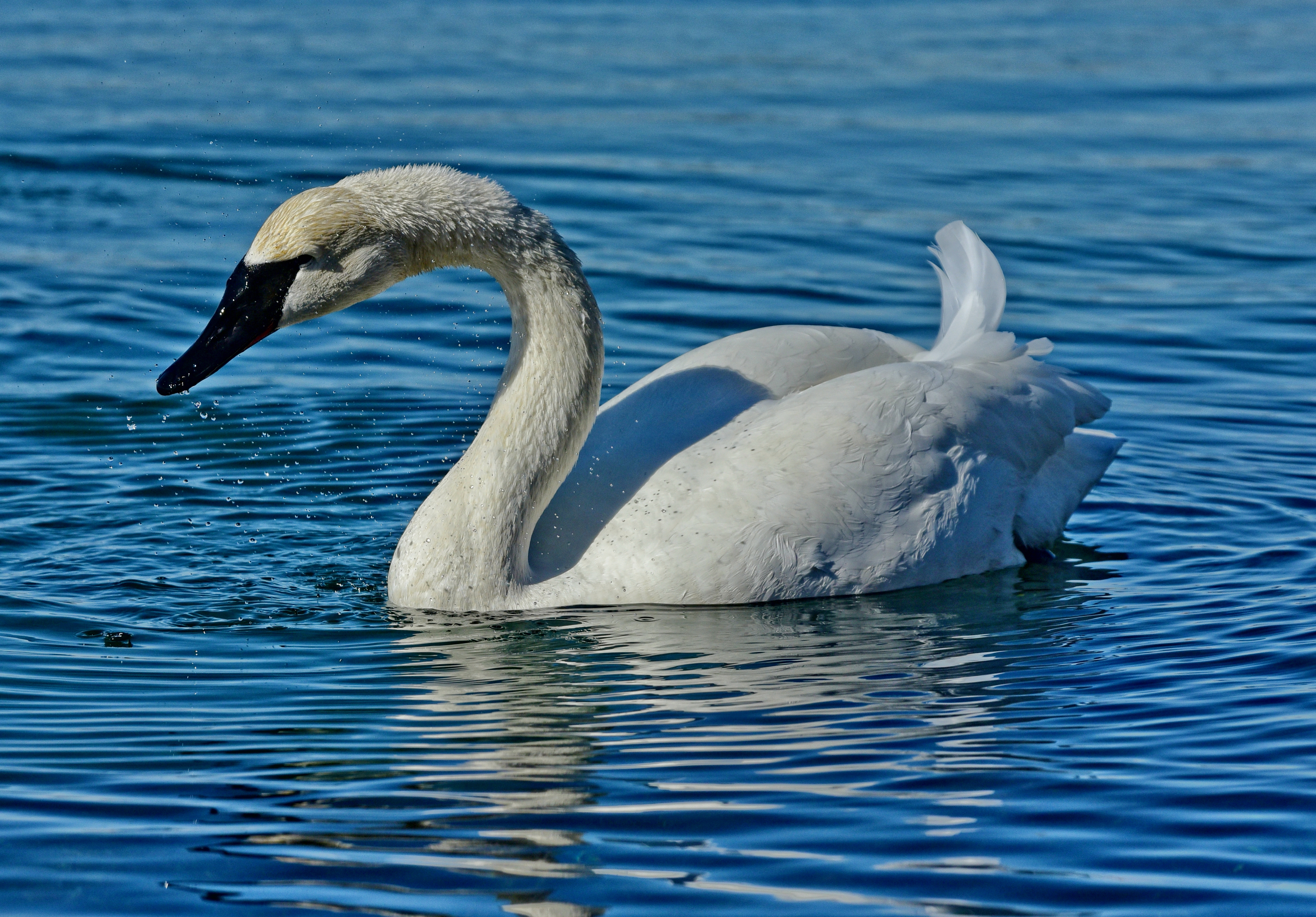
A trumpeter swan swimming on the Toronto waterfront.

- Accipitridae
  - Bald eagle
  - Five species from the genus Buteo
  - Cooper's hawk
  - Golden eagle
  - Mississippi kite
  - Northern goshawk
  - Northern harrier
  - Sharp-shinned hawk
  - Swallow-tailed kite
- Anatidae
  - Nine species from the subfamily Anatinae
  - Barrow's goldeneye
  - Bufflehead
  - Canada goose
  - Canvasback
  - Common eider
  - Common goldeneye
  - Common merganser
  - Lesser scaup
  - Long-tailed duck
  - Hooded merganser
  - Harlequin duck
  - Mute swan
  - Red-breasted merganser
  - Redhead
  - Ruddy duck
  - Trumpeter swan
  - Wood duck
- Auks
  - Ancient murrelet
  - Black guillemot
  - Little auk
  - Razorbill
  - Thick-billed murre
- Barn-owl
  - Barn owl
- Calcariidae
  - Lapland longspur
  - Chestnut-collared longspur
  - Snow bunting
- Cardinalidae
  - Blue grosbeak
  - Dickcissel
  - Indigo bunting
  - Lazuli bunting
  - Northern cardinal
  - Painted bunting
  - Rose-breasted grosbeak
  - Summer tanager
  - Western tanager
- Charadriidae
  - American golden-plover
  - Black-bellied Plover
  - Killdeer
  - Semipalmated Plover
  - Piping Plover
- Coots
  - American coot
  - American purple gallinule
  - Common gallinule
  - King rail
  - Sora
  - Virginia rail
  - Yellow rail
- Cormorant
  - Double-crested cormorant
  - Great cormorant
- Crane
  - Sandhill crane
  - Whooping crane
- Crow
  - American crow
  - Blue jay
  - Black-billed magpie
  - Common raven
  - Canada jay
  - Western jackdaw
- Cuckoo
  - Black-billed cuckoo
  - Yellow-billed cuckoo
- Falcon
  - American kestrel
  - Merlin
  - Gyrfalcon
  - Peregrine falcon
- Finch
  - Arctic redpoll
  - American goldfinch
  - Brambling
  - Common redpoll
  - Evening grosbeak
  - House finch
  - Lesser goldfinch
  - Pine grosbeak
  - Pine siskin
  - Purple finch
  - Red crossbill
  - Two-barred crossbill
- Gannet
  - Northern gannet
- Gnatcatcher
  - Blue-grey gnatcatcher
- Grebe
  - Black-necked grebe
  - Horned grebe
  - Pied-billed grebe
  - Red-necked grebe
  - Western grebe
- Heron
  - American bittern
  - Black-crowned night heron
  - Cattle egret
  - Green heron
  - Great blue heron
  - Great egret
  - Little blue heron
  - Snowy egret
  - Tricolored heron
  - Yellow-crowned night heron
- Hummingbird
  - Rufous hummingbird
  - Ruby-throated hummingbird
- Ibis
  - American white ibis
  - Glossy ibis
  - White-faced ibis
- Icterid
  - Baltimore oriole
  - Bobolink
  - Brewer's blackbird
  - Brown-headed cowbird
  - Bullock's oriole
  - Common grackle
  - Eastern meadowlark
  - Orchard oriole
  - Red-winged blackbird
  - Rusty blackbird
  - Western meadowlark
  - Yellow-headed blackbird
- Kingfisher
  - Belted kingfisher
- Kinglet
  - Golden-crowned kinglet
  - Ruby-crowned kinglet
- Laridae
  - Arctic tern
  - Black-headed gull
  - Black-legged kittiwake
  - Black skimmer
  - Black tern
  - Bonaparte's gull
  - Caspian tern
  - Forster's tern
  - Franklin's gull
  - Ivory gull
  - Eleven species from the genus Larus
  - Laughing gull
  - Little gull
  - Sabine's gull
- Lark
  - Horned lark
- Loon
  - Common loon
  - Pacific loon
  - Red-throated loon
- Mimid
  - Brown thrasher
  - Grey catbird
  - Northern mockingbird
- Motacillidae
  - Buff-bellied pipit
- New World quail
  - Northern bobwhite
- New World vulture
  - Black vulture
  - Turkey vulture
- New World warbler
  - 52 species of New World warblers
- Nightjar
  - Chuck-will’s-widow
  - Common nighthawk
  - Eastern whip-poor-will
- Nuthatch
  - Red-breasted nuthatch
  - White-breasted nuthatch
- Old World flycatcher
  - Northern wheatear
  - Siberian rubythroat
- Osprey
  - Osprey
- Oystercatcher
  - American oystercatcher
- Pelican
  - American white pelican
  - Brown pelican
- Phasianidae
  - Common pheasant
  - Grey partridge
  - Ruffed grouse
  - Spruce grouse
  - Willow ptarmigan
  - Wild turkey
- Pigeons
  - Band-tailed pigeon
  - Eurasian collared dove
  - Mourning dove
  - Rock dove
  - White-winged dove
- Procellariidae
  - Black-capped petrel
  - Great shearwater
  - Manx shearwater
  - Northern fulmar
- Recurvirostridae
  - American avocet
  - Black-necked stilt
- Sandpiper
  - 34 species of sandpipers
- Shrike
  - Loggerhead shrike
  - Northern shrike
- Skua
  - Long-tailed jaeger
  - Pomarine jaeger
  - Parasitic jaeger
- Sparrows
  - 24 species of sparrows
- Starling
  - Common starling
- Swallows
  - Barn swallow
  - Cave swallow
  - Northern rough-winged swallow
  - Purple martin
  - Sand martin
  - Tree swallow
- Swift
  - Chimney swift
- Thrush
  - American robin
  - Eastern bluebird
  - Fieldfare
  - Grey-cheeked thrush
  - Hermit thrush
  - Northern wheatear
  - Siberian rubythroat
  - Swainson's thrush
  - Townsend's solitaire
  - Varied thrush
  - Veery
  - Wood thrush
- Treecreeper
  - Brown creeper
- True owl
  - Barred owl
  - Boreal owl
  - Burrowing owl
  - Eastern screech owl
  - Great horned owl
  - Long-eared owl
  - Northern hawk owl
  - Short-eared owl
  - Snowy owl
- Tyrant flycatcher
  - Ash-throated flycatcher
  - Eastern kingbird
  - Eastern phoebe
  - Eastern wood pewee
  - Six species from the genus Empidonax
  - Fork-tailed flycatcher
  - Great crested flycatcher
  - Olive-sided flycatcher
  - Scissor-tailed flycatcher
  - Sulphur-bellied flycatcher
  - Variegated flycatcher
  - Vermilion flycatcher
  - Western kingbird
- Tit
  - Black-capped chickadee
  - Boreal chickadee
  - Tufted titmouse
- Vireonidae
  - Seven species from the genus Vireo.
- Waxwing
  - Bohemian waxwing
  - Cedar waxwing
  - Phainopepla
- Woodpecker
  - American three-toed woodpecker
  - Black-backed woodpecker
  - Downy woodpecker
  - Hairy woodpecker
  - Northern flicker
  - Pileated woodpecker
  - Red-bellied woodpecker
  - Red-headed woodpecker
  - Yellow-bellied sapsucker
- Wren
  - Bewick's wren
  - Carolina wren
  - House wren
  - Marsh wren
  - Rock wren
  - Sedge wren
  - Winter wren

=== Fish ===
There is approximately 100 species of coldwater, coolwater, and warmwater fish found within the waterways of Greater Toronto. The following fish species are found in the creeks, ponds, and rivers that make up the Toronto waterway system, and the Toronto waterfront along Lake Ontario:

- Black bullhead
- Black crappie
- Bluegill
- Bluntnose minnow
- Channel catfish
- Chinook salmon
- Green sunfish
- Largemouth bass
- Northern hog sucker
- Northern pike
- Pumpkinseed
- Spottail shiner
- Stonecat
- Tadpole madtom
- White bass
- White sucker
- Yellow perch

=== Mammals ===
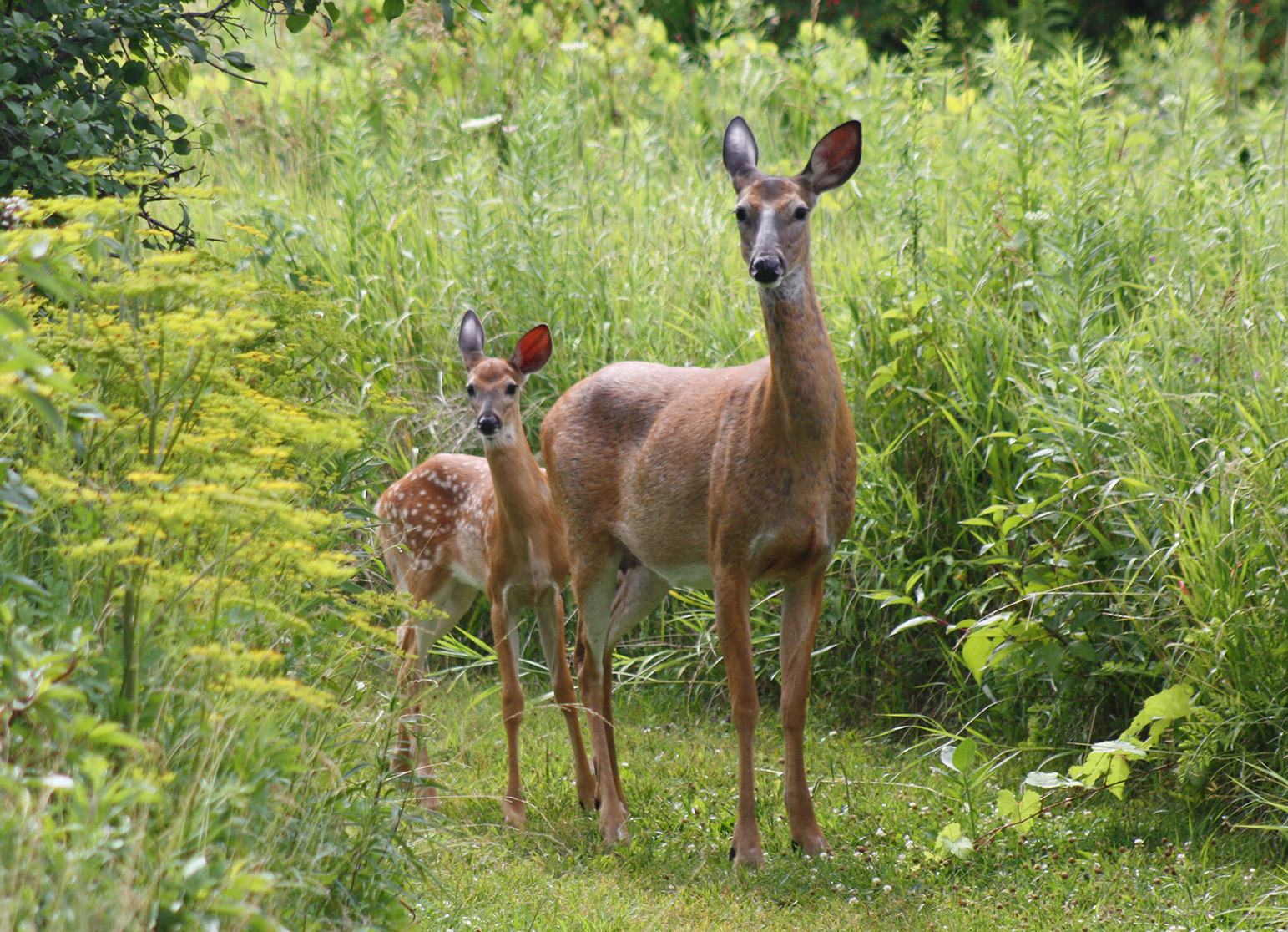
Two white-tailed deers near the West Humber River Trail in Toronto.

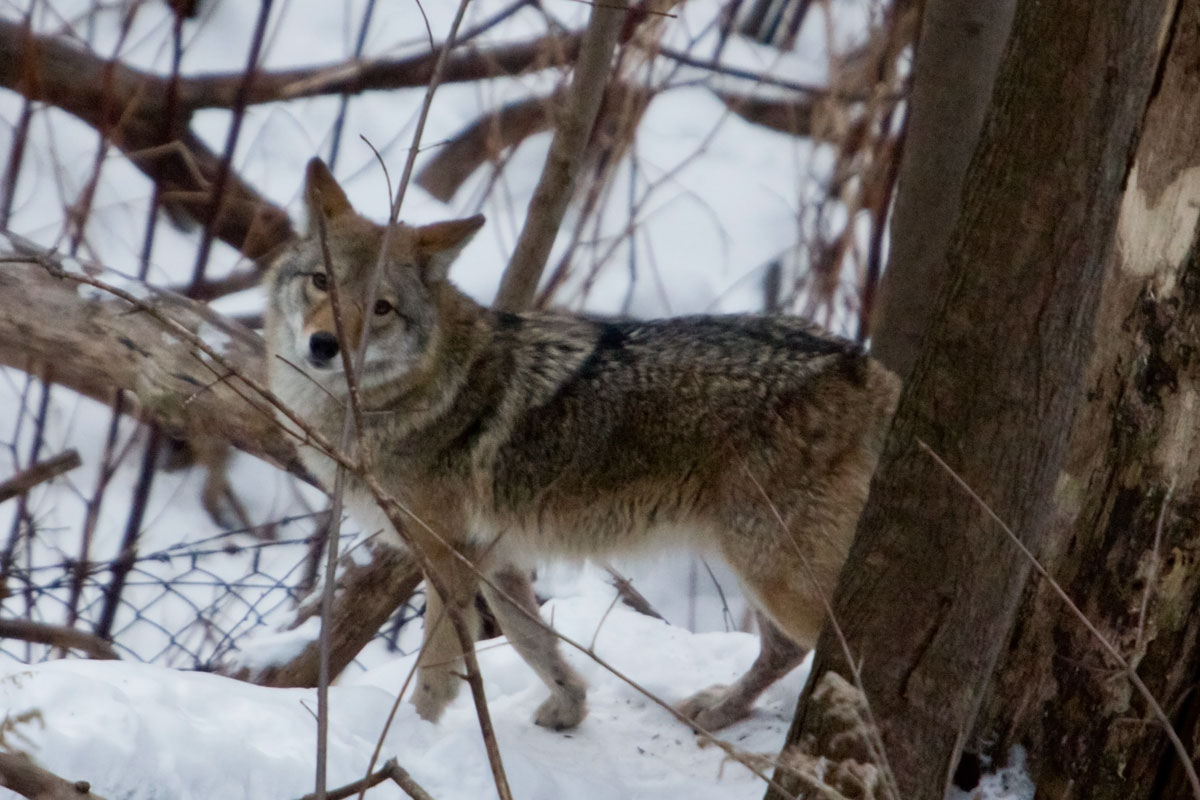
A coyote in Neville Park

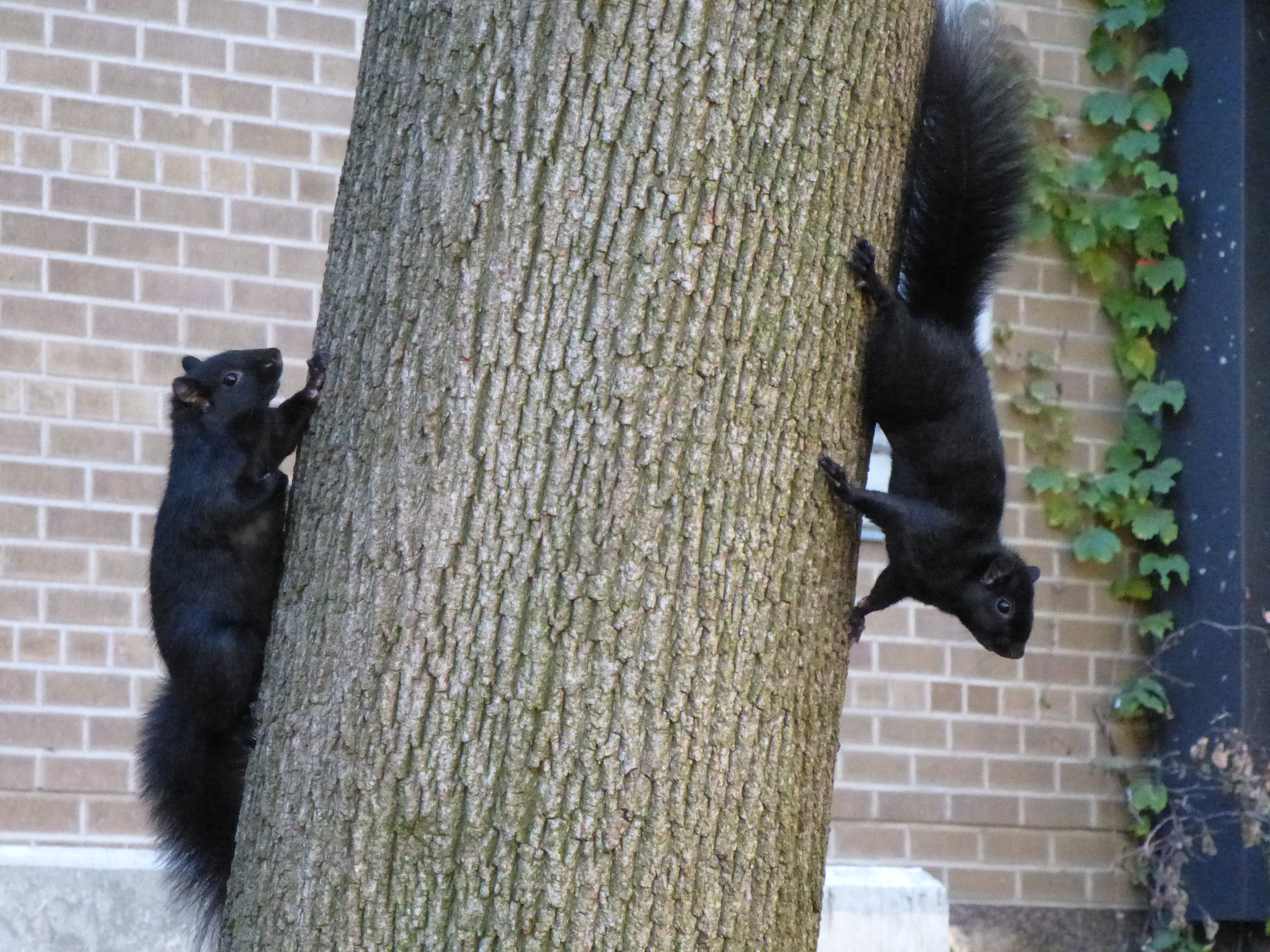
Two melanistic eastern grey squirrel on a tree at Toronto Metropolitan University

There are 38 species of mammals that reside within Toronto, although these numbers have fluctuated due to environmental changes and loss of natural habitats during the past century. The following mammals (sorted by family) may be found throughout the City of Toronto:

- Canids
  - Coyote
  - Red fox
- Castoridae
  - North American beaver
- Cricetidae
  - Deer mouse
  - Meadow vole
  - Muskrat
  - White-footed mouse
- Deer
  - White-tailed deer
- Dipodidae
  - Meadow jumping mouse
- Hares and rabbits
  - Eastern cottontail
  - European hare
  - Snowshoe hare
- Muridae
  - Brown rat
  - House mouse
- Mustelidae
  - American mink
  - Long-tailed weasel
  - North American river otter
  - Short-tailed weasel
- New World porcupine
  - Canadian porcupine
- Opossum
  - Virginia opossum
- Procyonidae
  - Raccoon
- Shrew
  - American pygmy shrew
  - Masked shrew
  - Northern short-tailed shrew
  - Smoky shrew
- Skunk
  - Striped skunk
- Squirrel
  - American red squirrel
  - Eastern chipmunk
  - Eastern grey squirrel (including black squirrels)
  - Groundhog
  - Northern flying squirrel
  - Southern flying squirrel
- Talpidae
  - Hairy-tailed mole
  - Star-nosed mole
- Vesper bat
  - Big brown bat
  - Eastern red bat
  - Eastern small-footed myotis
  - Hoary bat
  - Little brown bat
  - Silver-haired bat
  - Northern long-eared bat

==== Historic species ====
The historic range for several mammal species once extended into the City of Toronto. However, as the city developed, the natural range for several mammals receded beyond the city limits. At least 11 species of mammals were extirpated from the region. The historic range for the following mammals once included Toronto, but were pushed beyond the city limits prior to 1912:

- Bear
  - American black bear
- Canids
  - Grey wolf
- Cats
  - Bobcat
  - Canada lynx
  - Cougar
- Cricetidae
  - Southern red-backed vole
- Deer
  - Elk
  - Moose
- Mustelidae
  - American marten
  - Fisher

== Invertebrates ==
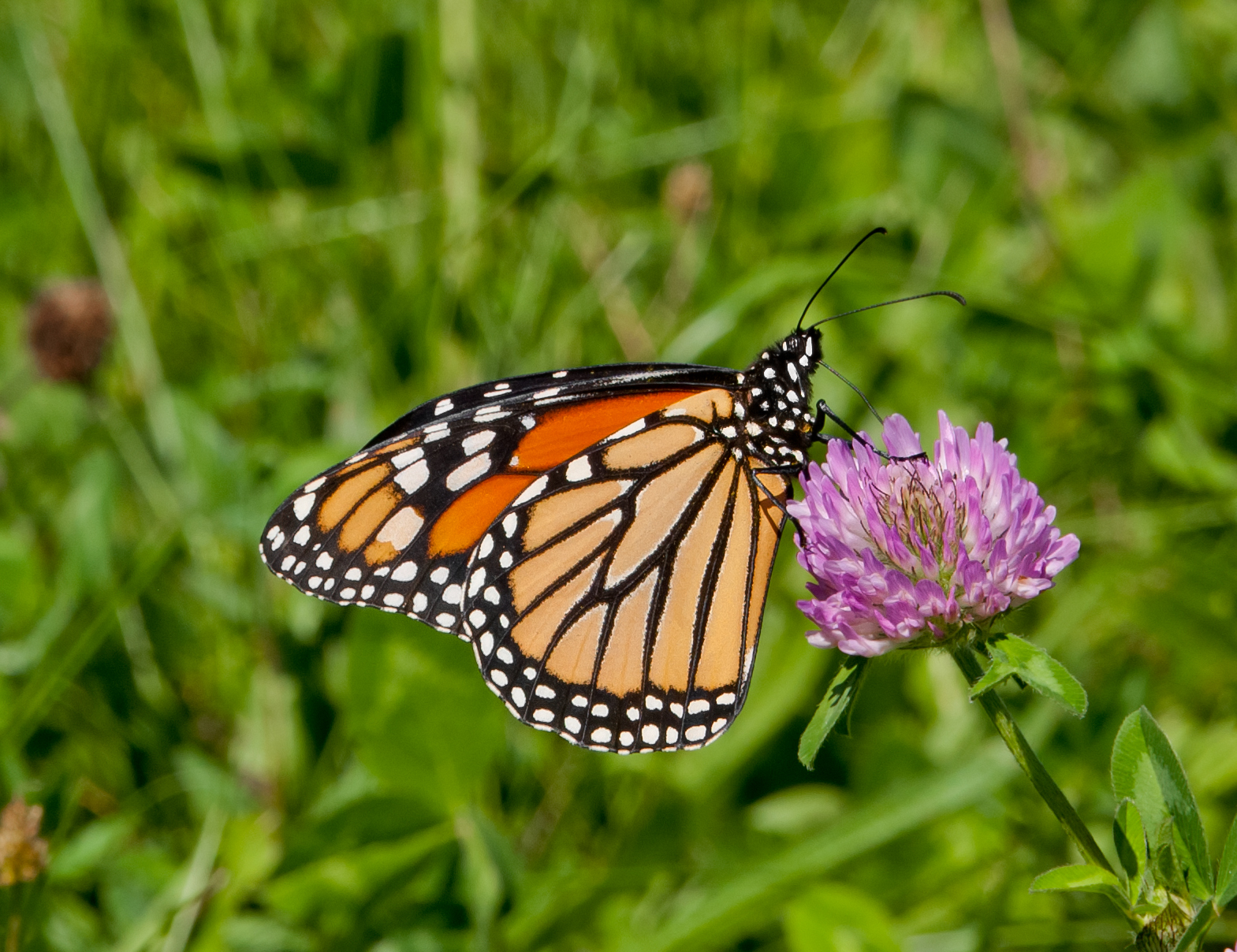
A monarch butterfly nectaring in The Queensway – Humber Bay.

Within the city of Toronto, there exists approximately 110 species of butterflies, although this number is prone to fluctuations as a result of a varied environment from year to year. There is approximately six families of bees in Toronto, which includes 37 genera and 364 species of bees in Toronto. Past published records estimate that there are 25 genera and approximately 200 species of spiders in Toronto; 24 of which were introduced to the region. However, it is estimated that the actual number of species that exist in the city is approximately three times larger. The following insects may be found throughout the City of Toronto including:

- Alderfly
- Ants
- Apoidea
  - Bees
  - Hornet
  - Wasp
- Barklice
- Beetles
- Caddisfly
- Common walkingstick
- Dusky cockroach
- Common earwig
- Fishflies
  - Dark fishfly
  - Spring fishfly
- Flies
- Lacewings
  - Brown lacewing
  - Green lacewing
- Lepidoptera
  - Butterflies
  - Moth
- Mayfly
- Odonata
  - Damselflies
  - Dragonflies
- Orthoptera
  - Ensifera
  - Grasshopper
- Scorpionfly
- Stonefly
- Praying mantis

== See also ==
- Fauna of Canada
- List of Toronto parks
- Native trees in Toronto
- Toronto and Region Conservation Authority
