= Native trees in Toronto =

Flora in Ontario, Canada

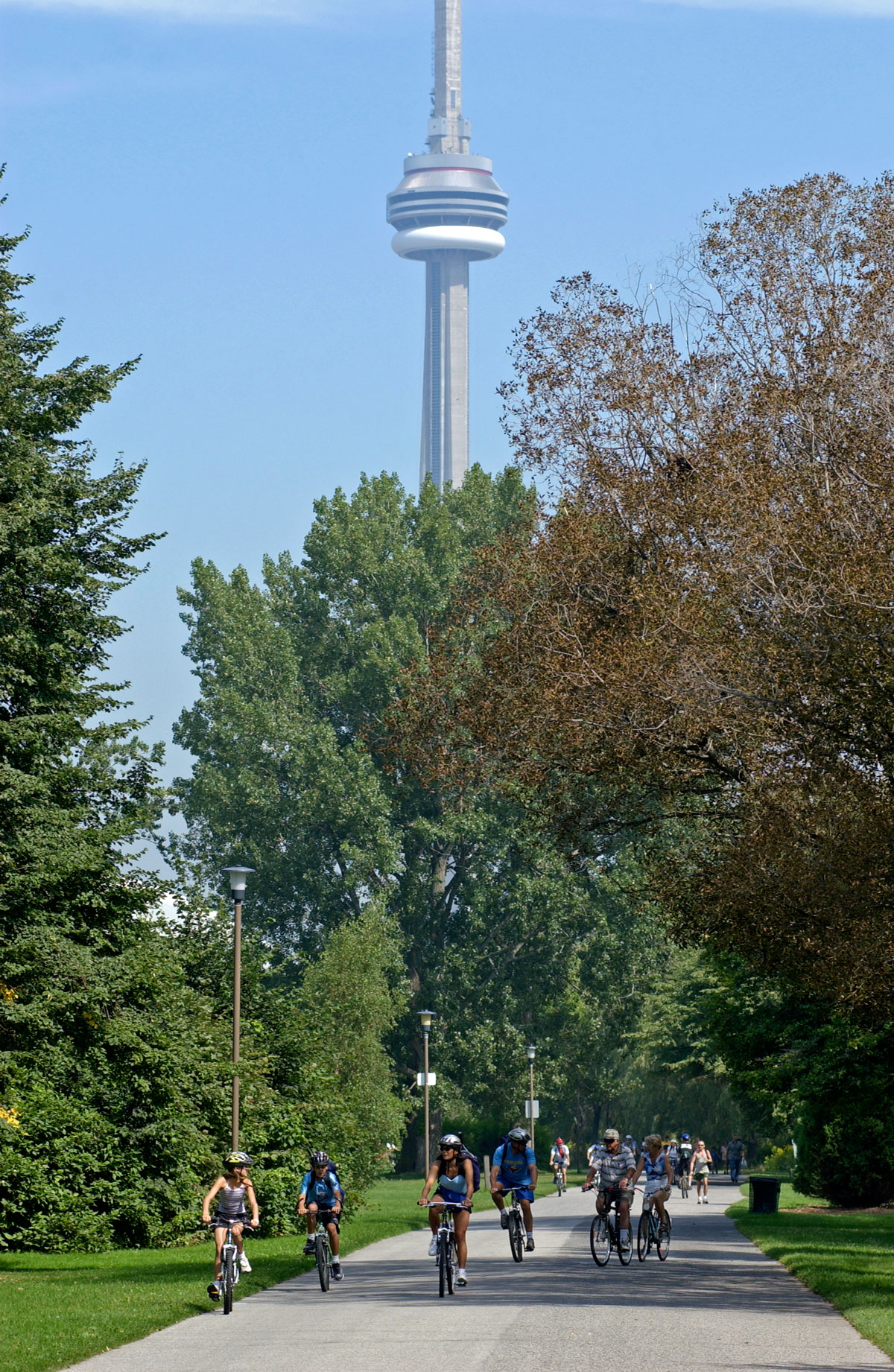
Trees on Toronto island

Native trees in Toronto are trees that are naturally growing in Toronto and were not later introduced by humans. The area that presently comprise Toronto is a part of the Carolinian forest, although agricultural and urban developments destroyed significant portions of that life zone. In addition, many of Toronto's native trees have been displaced by non-native plants and trees introduced by settlers from Europe and Asia from the 18th century to the present. Most of the native trees are found in the Toronto ravine system, parks, and along the Toronto waterway system.

The type of trees growing across the city varies based on the soil condition in the area. Tree cover in the city prior to European settlement started from the shore line back. Settlement resulted in trees being cut for use in building homes and ships and for heating by early residents. The current tree cover (or canopy) in Toronto is estimated to be between 26.6 and 28% and many trees are not native to the city. The city's Urban Forestry Services plants these trees on city property and encourages others in the city to do the same.

A partial list of native trees in Toronto:

- Ash
  - Black ash
  - Green ash
  - White ash
- Aspen
  - Balsam poplar
  - Large-tooth aspen
  - Trembling aspen
- Basswood
  - American basswood
- Birch
  - White birch
  - Yellow birch
- Beech
  - North American beech
- Cedar
  - Northern white cedar
- Chestnut
  - American chestnut
- Dogwoods
  - Alternate-leaved dogwood
- Elm
  - White elm
- Hackberry
  - Northern hackberry
- Hawthorns
- Hickory
  - Bittnut hickory
  - Shagbark hickory
- Hemlock
  - Eastern hemlock
- Hop-hornbeam
  - Ironwood
- Hornbeam
  - Blue-beech
- Larch
  - Tamarack
- Maple
  - Red maple
  - Silver maple
  - Striped maple
  - Sugar maple
- Mountain-ash
  - American mountain-ash
- Mulberry
  - Red mulberry
- Oak
  - Bur oak
  - Eastern black oak
  - Northern red oak
  - Pin oak
  - Swamp white oak
  - White oak
- Pine
  - Eastern white pine
- Sycamores
  - Buttonwood
- Prunus
  - Black cherry
  - Chokecherry
  - Pin cherry
- Sassafras
  - White sassafras
- Serviceberries
- Walnut
  - Butternut
  - Black walnut
- Willow
  - Black willow
  - Peachleaf willow

== See also ==
- Fauna of Toronto
- Oak Ridges Moraine
