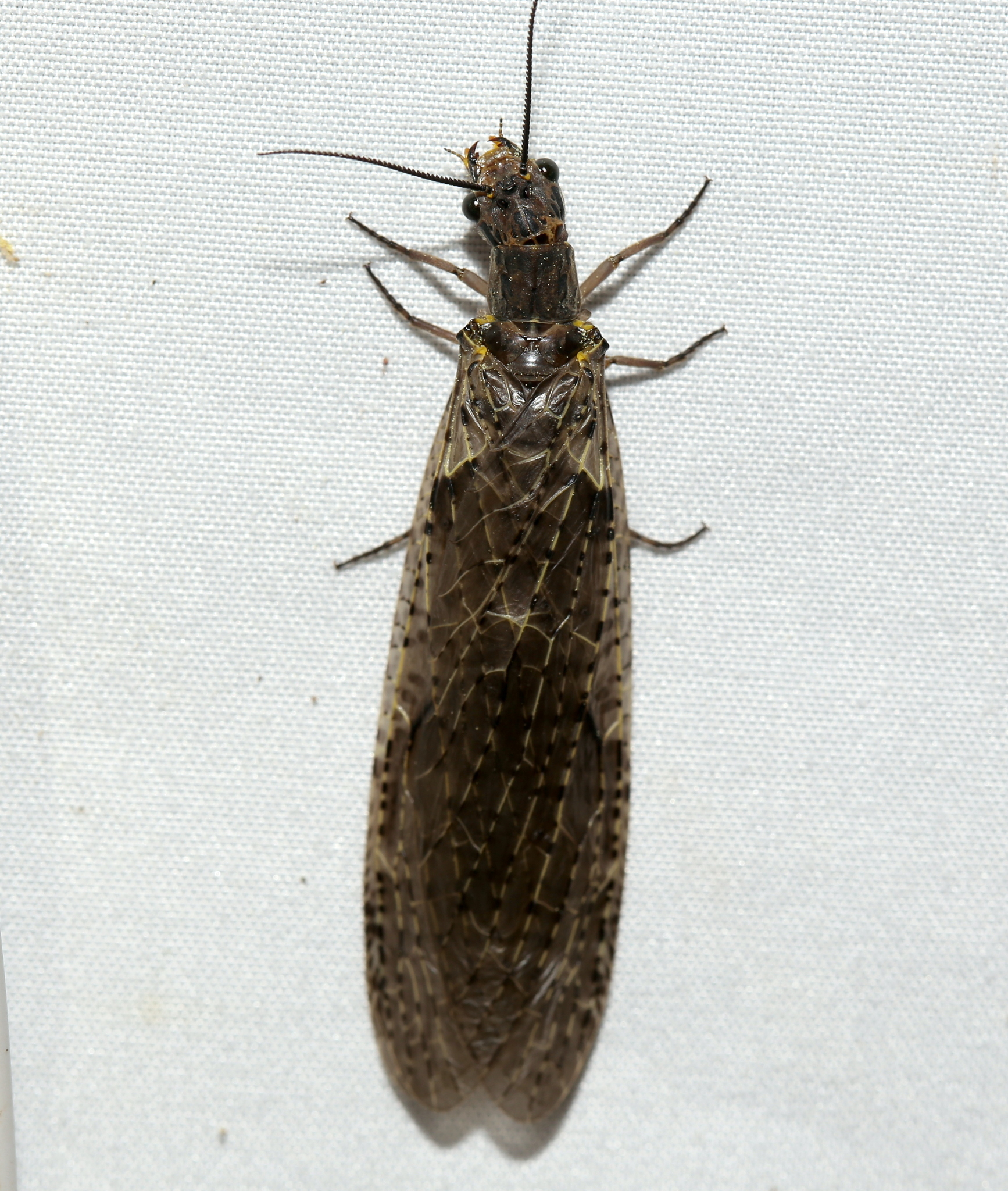

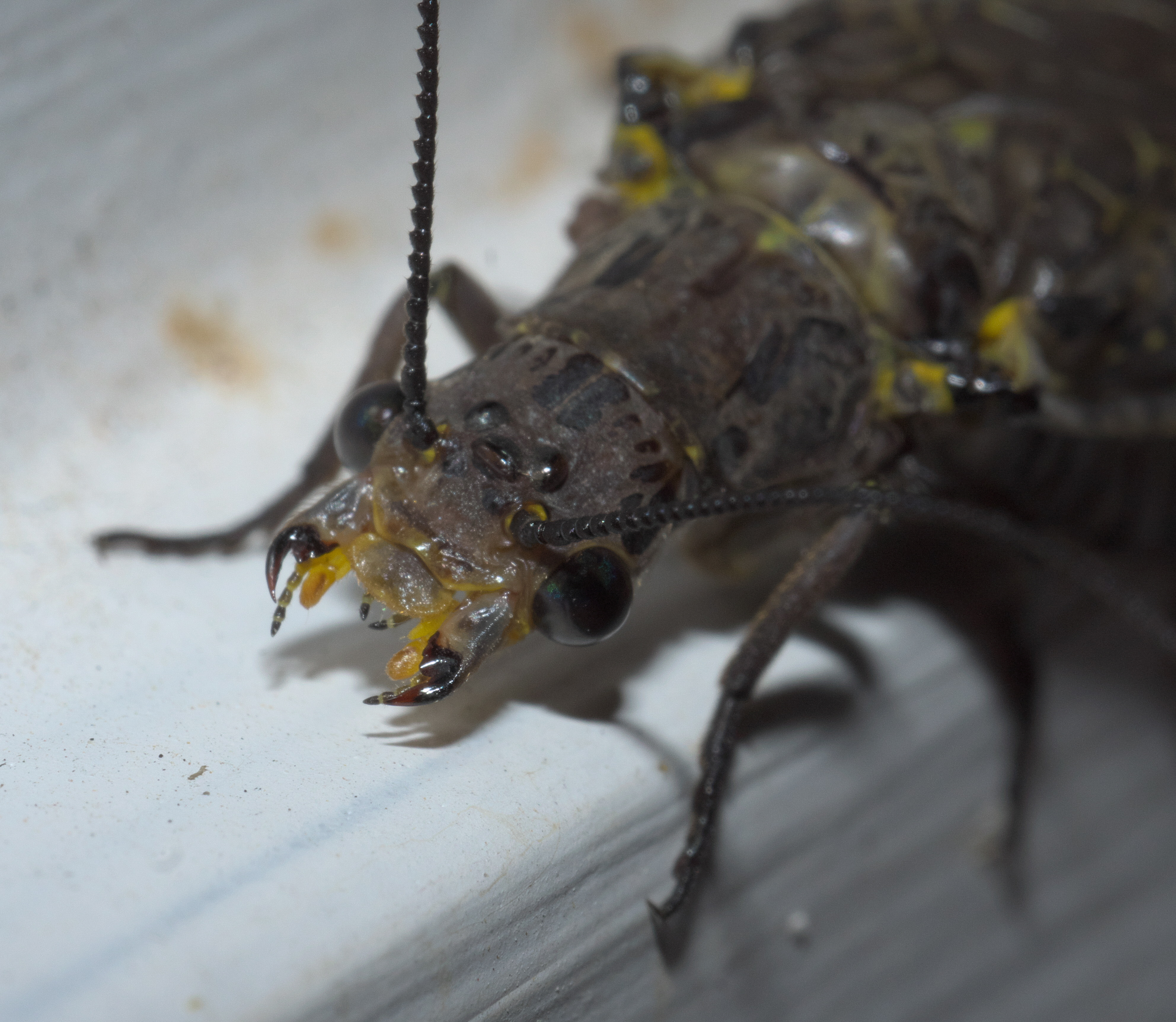

Scientific classification
- Kingdom: Animalia
- Phylum: Arthropoda
- Class: Insecta
- Order: Megaloptera
- Family: Corydalidae
- Genus: Chauliodes
- Species: C. rastricornis

Binomial name
- Chauliodes rastricornis Rambur, 1842

Synonyms
- Hermes indecisus Walker, 1853

= Chauliodes rastricornis =

Species of insect

Chauliodes rastricornis, the spring fishfly, is a species of fishfly in the family Corydalidae. It is found in North America.

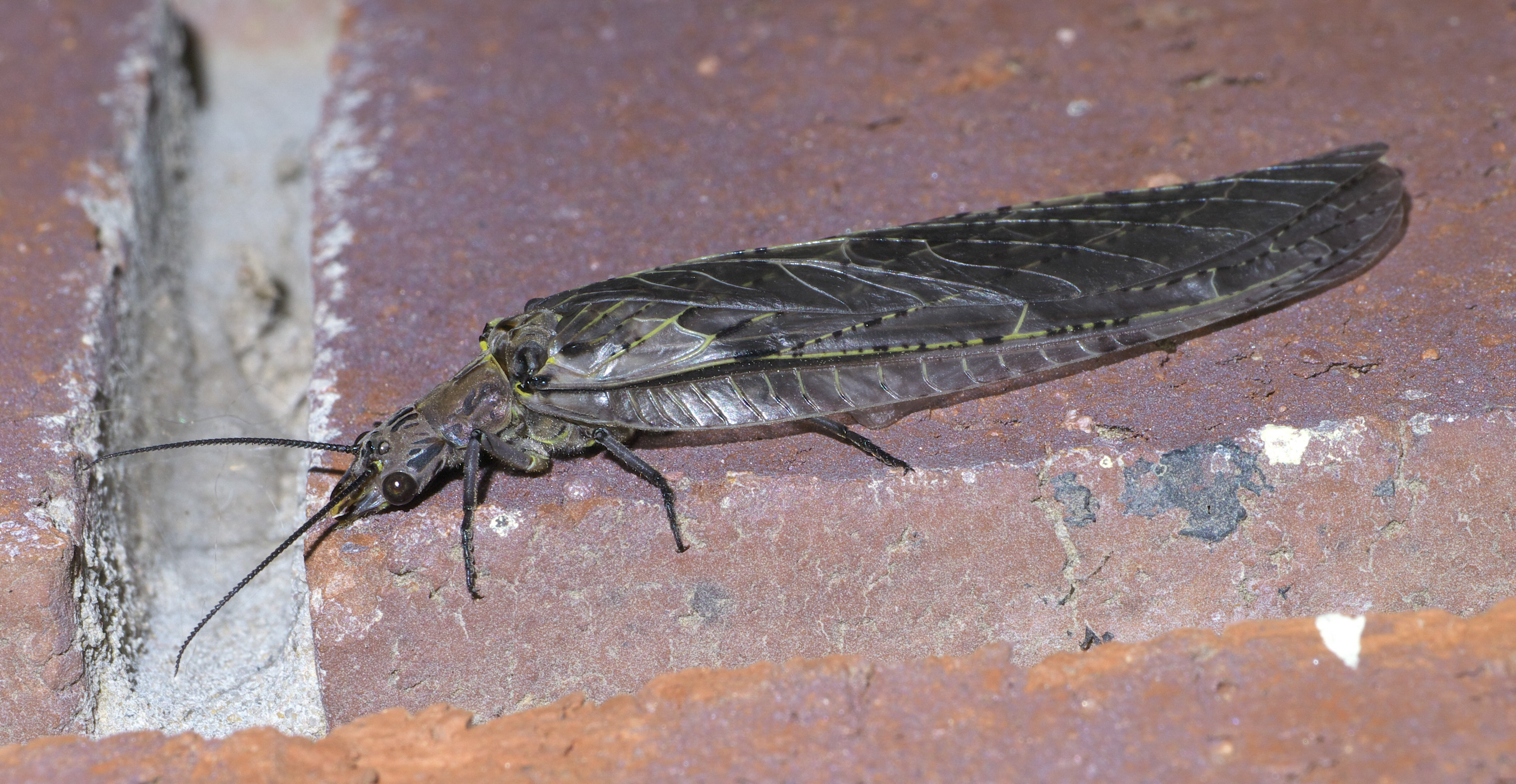
Spring fishfly, Chauliodes rastricornis

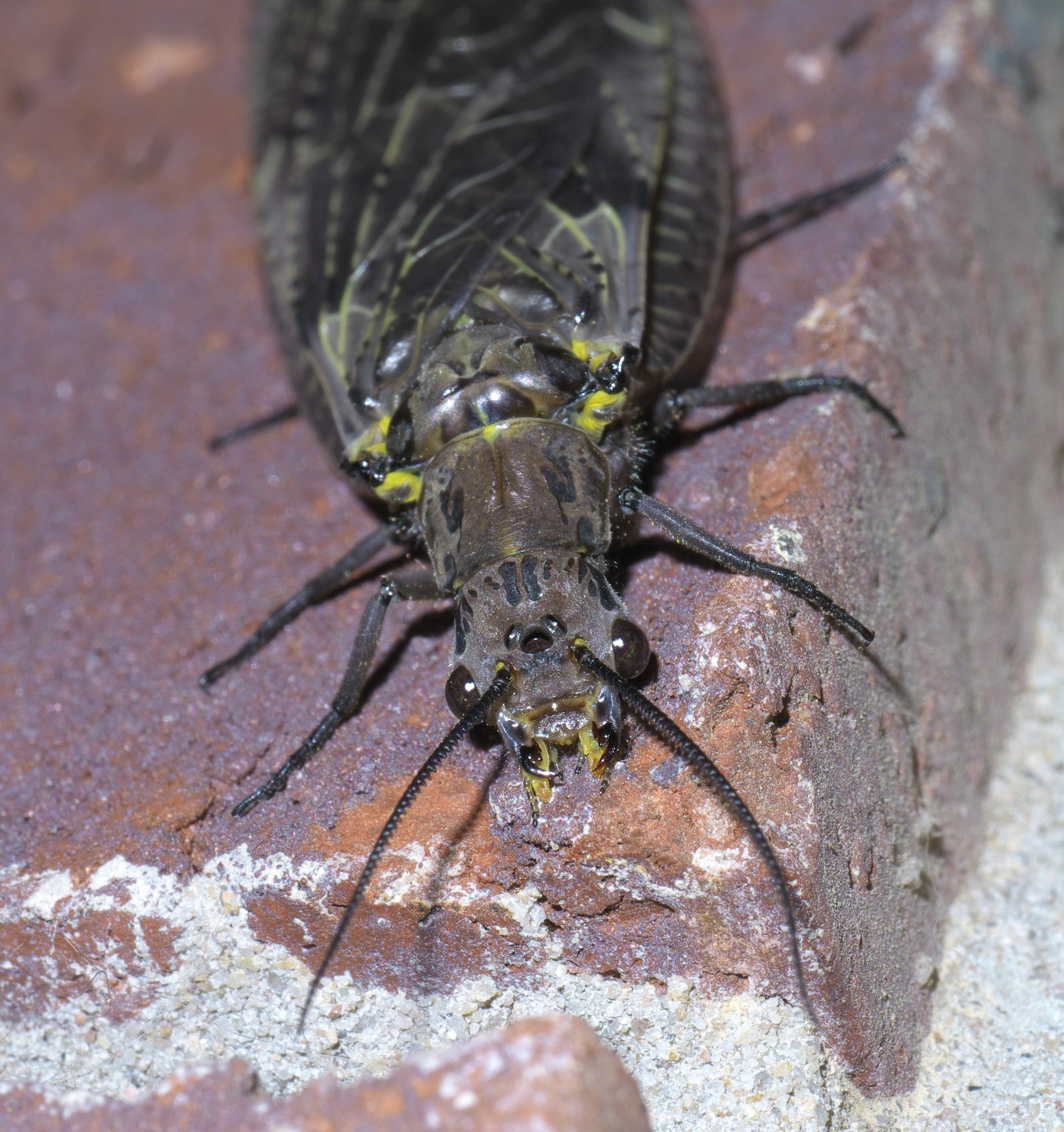
Spring fishfly, Chauliodes rastricornis

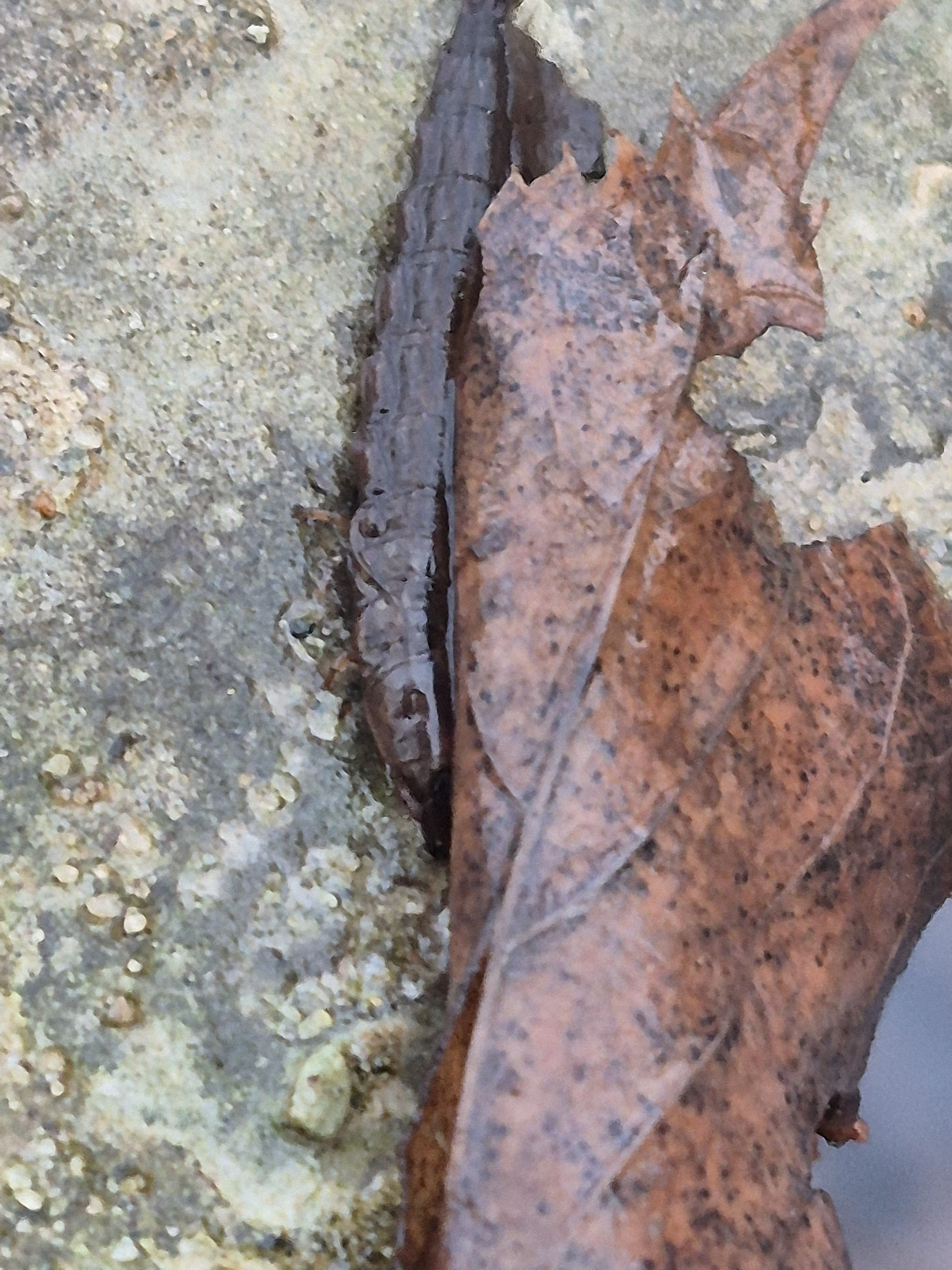
Spring fish fly larva
