= Toronto waterway system =

Watercourses in Toronto, Canada

Map of Toronto and its rivers that make up "Toronto ravine system".

The Toronto waterway system comprises a series of natural and man-made watercourses in the Canadian city of Toronto. The city is dominated by a large river system spanning most of the city including the Don River, Etobicoke Creek, Highland Creek, Humber River, Mimico Creek and Rouge River.

== Current rivers in Toronto ==
=== List ===
The city has many rivers that stretch all over the city and all end up draining into Lake Ontario. Of the various watercourses that drained Toronto, the Don River, the Humber River, and the Rouge River have headwaters in the Oak Ridges Moraine.

Name	Named current tributaries	Source location	Mouth location	Length	
Name	Named current tributaries	Source location	Mouth location	km	mi
Black Creek		43°49′35″N 79°33′34″W	43°40′10″N 79°30′41″W		
Burke Brook	Havergal Stream	43°43′14″N 79°24′29″W	43°43′14″N 79°21′56″W	9	5.6
Deerlick Creek		43°45'51.3"N 79°19'60.0"W	43°44'34.7"N 79°20'09.8"W	3	1.9
Don River	Castle Frank Brook, Yellow Creek, Taylor-Massey Creek, Burke Brook, German Mills Creek, Mud Creek	43°59′20″N 79°23′57″W	43°39'02.8"N 79°20'50.2"W	38	24
Duncan Creek		43°48'05.1"N 79°21'20.5"W	43°48'29.5"N 79°22'17.4"W	2	1.2
Etobicoke Creek	Spring Creek, Little Etobicoke Creek	43°47′19″N 79°53′39″W	43°35′05″N 79°32′28″W	61	38
German Mills Creek	Duncan Woods Creek	43°54′42″N 79°28′54″W	43°47′48″N 79°22′56″W	10	6.2
Highland Creek	West Highland Creek	43°48′54″N 79°16′51″W	43°46′0″N 79°08′41″W	29	18
Humber River	Albion Creek, Berry Creek, Black Creek, Centreville Creek, East Humber, Emery Creek, Humber Creek, King Creek, Purpleville Creek, Rainbow Creek, Salt Creek, Silver Creek, West Humber	43°56′36″N 80°00′14″W	43°37′56″N 79°28′19″W	100	62
Keating Channel		43°39′05″N 79°20′52″W	43°38′46″N 79°21′27″W	1	0.62
Mimico Creek		43°44′26″N 79°44′06″W	43°37′19″N 79°28′54″W	33	21
Mud Creek		43°41'40.8"N 79°22'50.7"W	43°40'57.0"N 79°22'00.6"W	2	1.2
Rouge River	Little Rouge River, Little Rough Creek, Katabokokohk Creek, Bruce Creek, Beaver Creek	43°56′07″N 79°24′34″W	43°47′41″N 79°06′55″W		
Taylor-Massey Creek		43°46′00″N 79°18′47″W	43°42′12″N 79°19′59″W	16	9.9
West Highland Creek	Southwest Highland Creek	43°49′00″N 79°18′15″W	43°46′27″N 79°11′58″W		
Yellow Creek		43°41'27.5"N 79°23'26.3"W	43°40'47.6"N 79°21'55.8"W	3	1.9

=== Humber River ===
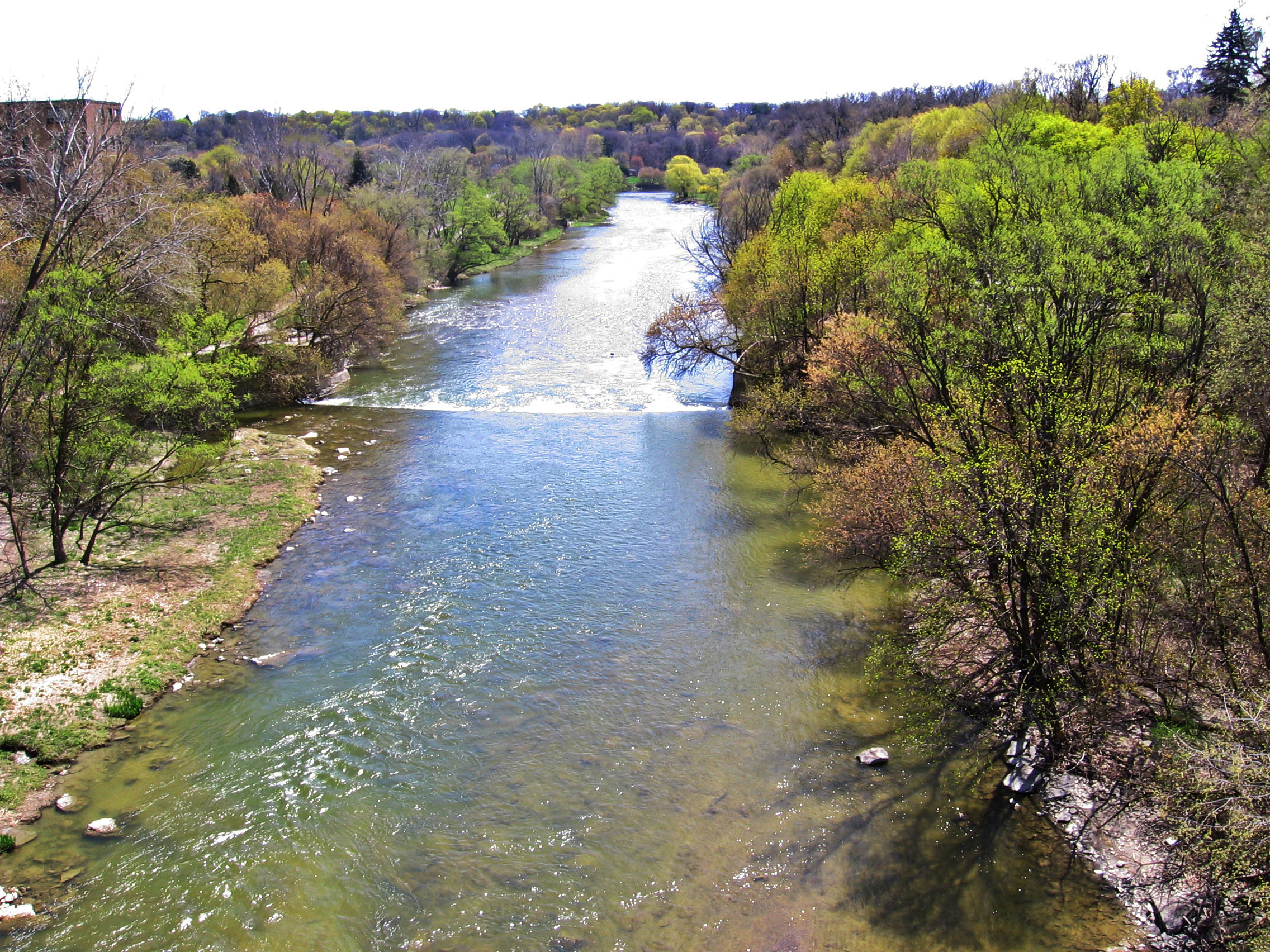
The Humber River from the Dundas Street Bridge.

The Humber River is a river in Southern Ontario, Canada. It is in the Great Lakes Basin, is a tributary of Lake Ontario and is one of two major rivers on either side of the city of Toronto, the other being the Don River to the east. It was designated a Canadian Heritage River on September 24, 1999.

The Humber collects from about 750 creeks and tributaries in a fan-shaped area north of Toronto that encompasses portions of Dufferin County, the Regional Municipality of Peel, Simcoe County, and the Regional Municipality of York. The main branch runs for about 100 kilometres (60 mi) from the Niagara Escarpment in the northwest, while another other major branch, known as the East Humber River, starts at Lake St. George in the Oak Ridges Moraine near Aurora to the northeast. They join north of Toronto and then flow in a generally southeasterly direction into Lake Ontario at what was once the far western portions of the city. The river mouth is flanked by Sir Casimir Gzowski Park and Humber Bay Park East. The Source of the River is the Huber Spring Pond and the basin is 903 km^{2} .

=== Don River ===
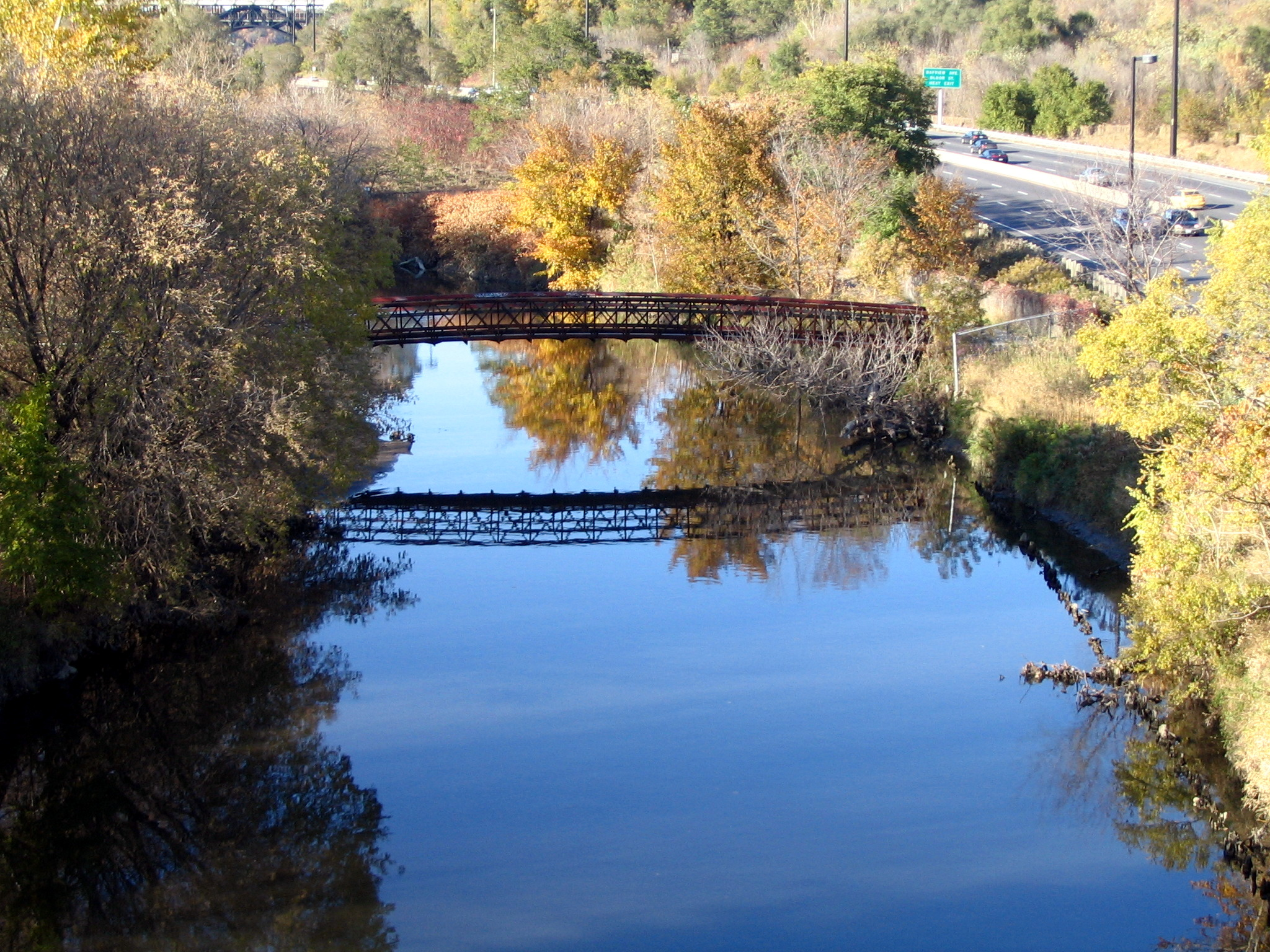
The lower Don River near Riverdale Park, south of where the two main branches meet.

The Don River is a watercourse in southern Ontario, that empties into Lake Ontario, at Toronto Harbour. Its mouth was just east of the street grid of the town of York, Upper Canada, the municipality that evolved into Toronto, Ontario. The Don is formed from two rivers, the East and West Branches, that meet about 7 kilometres (4 mi) north of Lake Ontario while flowing southward into the lake. The area below the confluence is known as the lower Don, and the areas above as the upper Don. The Don is also joined at the confluence by a third major branch, Taylor-Massey Creek. The Toronto and Region Conservation Authority (TRCA) is responsible for managing the river and its surrounding watershed. The Don Valley is notable because of its deep wide valley in the lower reaches due to its glacial origins. Due to the urbanized nature of the watershed, the Don River experiences low base flows interspersed with high volume floods. The river flows into Lake Ontario at the Keating Channel at Lake Shore Boulevard East which is at the north east corner of the Toronto Harbour. The Source of the River is the Oak Ridge Moraine and the basin is 360 km^{2} . The average flow of the river is 4 m^{3}/s.

=== Rouge River ===
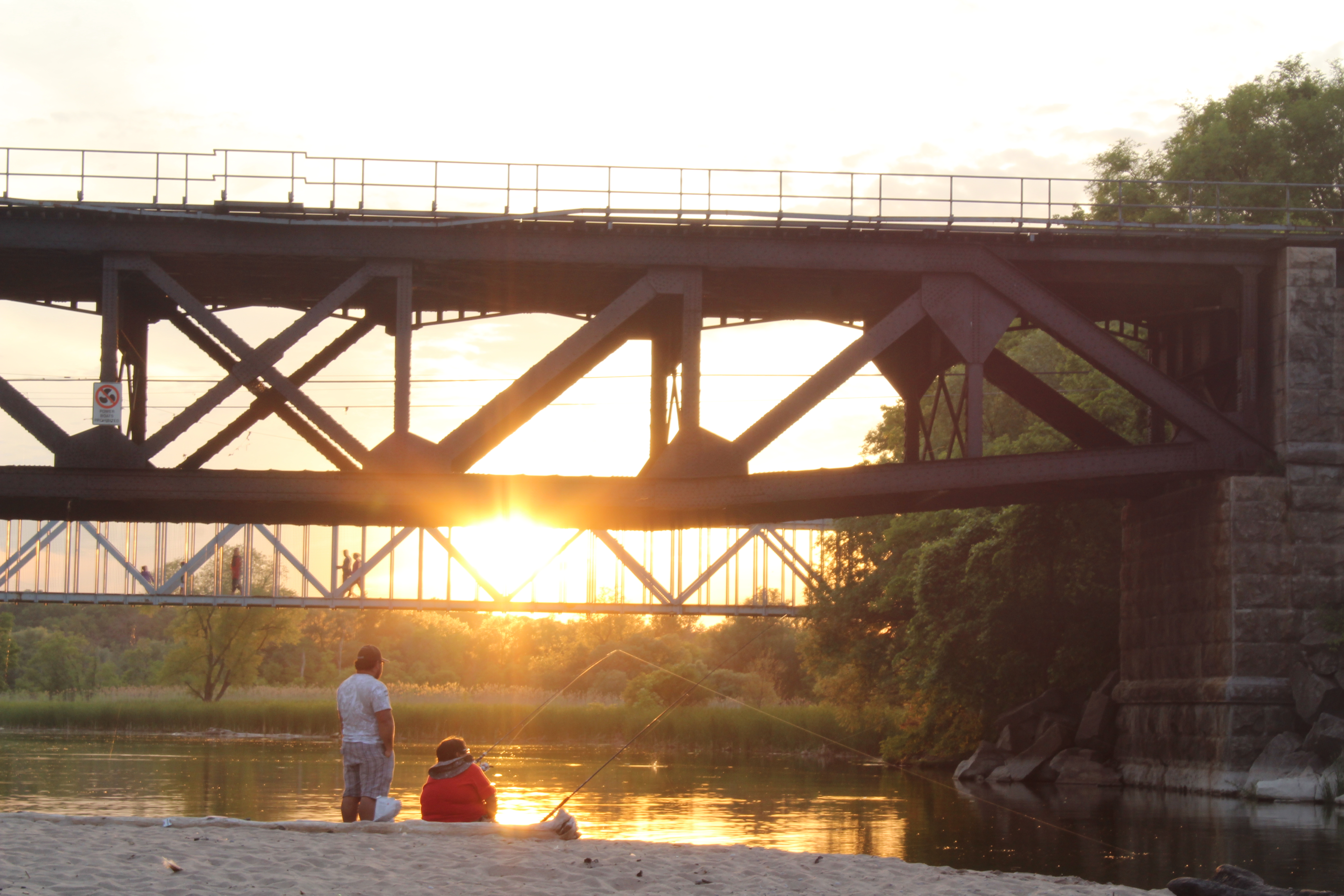
The Rouge River at Rouge National Urban Park.

The Rouge River is a river in Markham, Pickering, Richmond Hill and Toronto in the Greater Toronto Area of Ontario, Canada. The river flows from the Oak Ridges Moraine to Lake Ontario at the eastern border of Toronto, and is the location of Rouge Park, the only national park in Canada within a municipality. At its southern end, the Rouge River is the boundary between Toronto and southwestern Pickering in the Regional Municipality of Durham. The Source of the River is the Oak Ridge Moraine and the basin is 336 km^{2} . The average flow of the river is 1.76 m^{3}/s.

== Former rivers of Toronto ==
The city also has many rivers that were buried or completely removed to make way for development and the rapid expansion of the city.

- Ashbridge's Creek
- Bonar Creek
- Castle Field Creek
- Castle Frank Brook
- Cudmore Creek
- Garrison Creek
- Jackson Creek
- Market Steams
- North Creek
- Russell Creek
- Small's Creek
- Superior Creek
- Taddle Creek
- Tomlin's Creek
- Walmsley Creek
- Wendigo Creek

== See also ==
- Fauna of Toronto
- Toronto and Region Conservation Authority
- Toronto ravine system
