= Bay-and-gable =

Residential architectural style in Canada

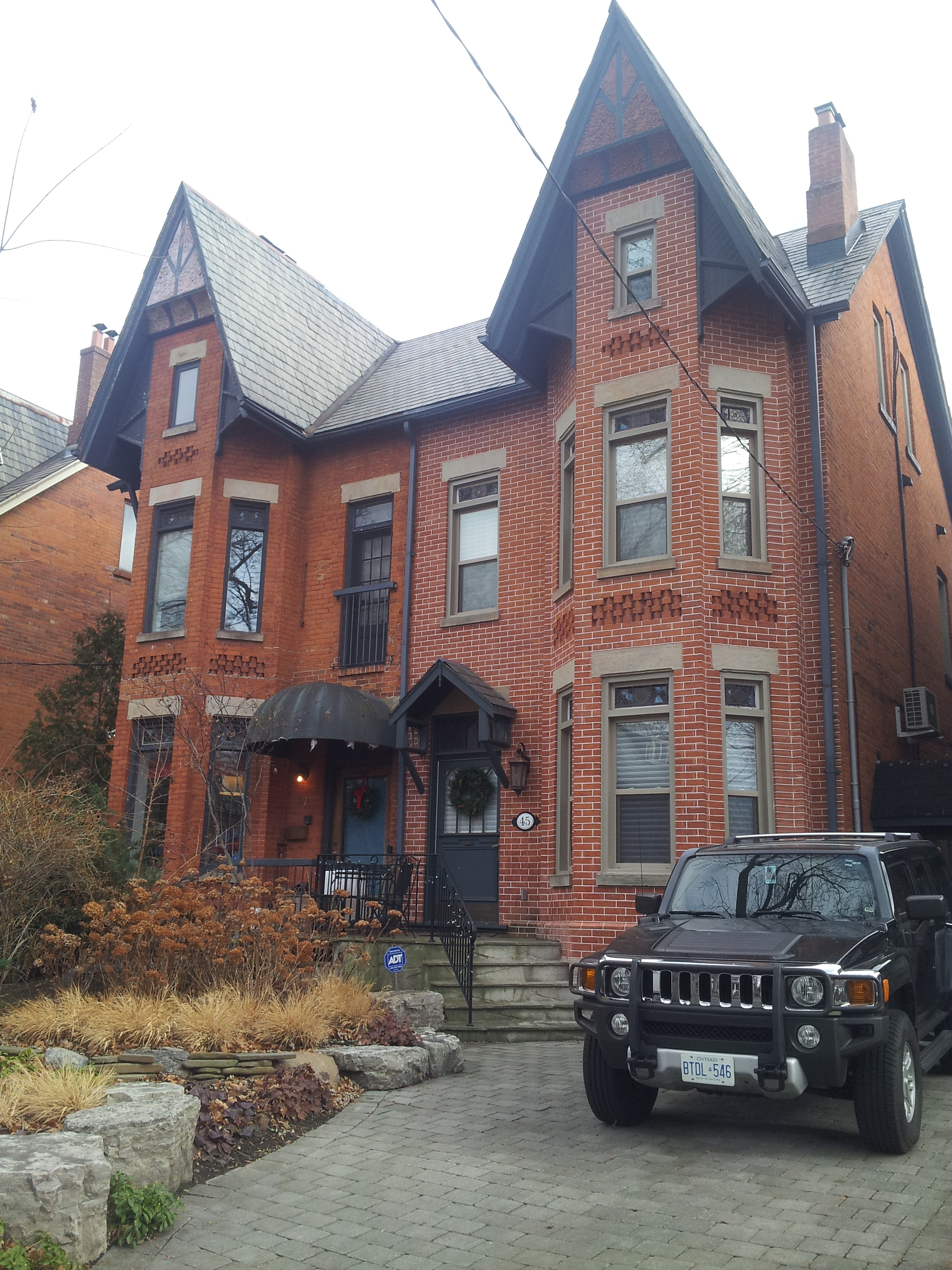
A semi-detached bay-and-gable in Toronto. The design features a prominent bay window aligned to the front gable.

The bay-and-gable is a distinct residential architectural style that is ubiquitous in the older portions of Toronto, Ontario, Canada. The most prominent feature of the style is a large bay window that usually covers more than half the front façade of the home, surmounted by a gable roof. The bay window typically extends from the ground level towards the roof, although a variant of the housing form exists where the bay window fronts only the first level; known as a half-bay-and-gable. The housing form may be built as a stand-alone structure, although it is more often built as a semi-detached, or as terraced houses.

The form emerged during the 1860s, with architects adopting elements commonly associated with English villas and Gothic-styled buildings due to their popularity with residents during that period. As the city underwent significant population growth in the latter half of the 19th century, scaled versions of the bay-and-gable design were built by developers as they proved to be efficient housing forms that could be built at a pace that kept up with Toronto's population growth. The housing form was also popular amongst homeowners who sought more ornamentations on their homes, with the gables and large windows providing areas that could be decorated with minimal investment. A large number of bay-and-gable homes were built until the late 1890s when it was supplanted by other housing styles.

The housing form re-emerged in the late 20th and early 21st century, with several residential developments within the city and the Greater Toronto Area being infilled with bay-and-gable variants.

== Description ==
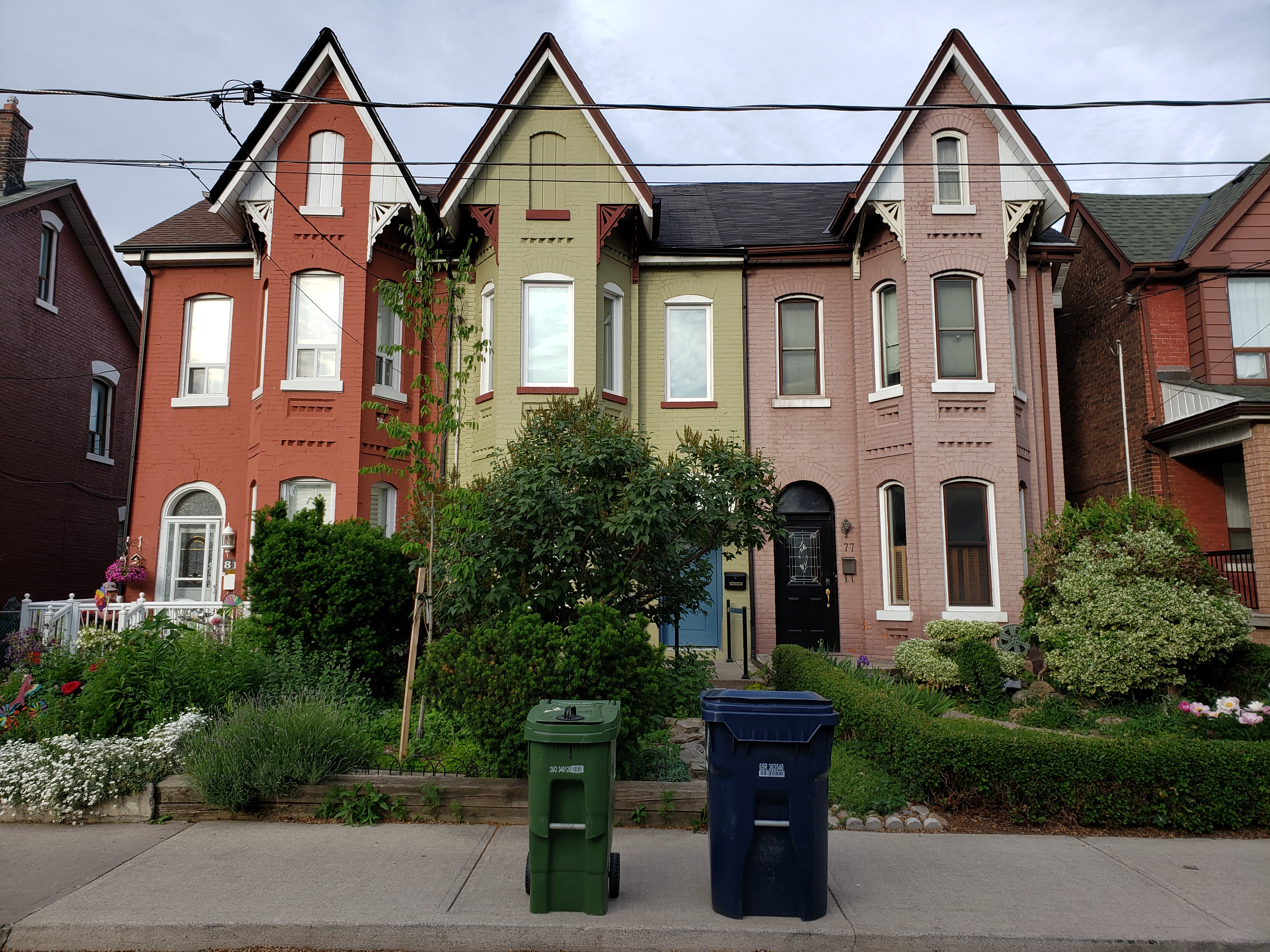
Bay-and-gable row homes in Little Portugal, Toronto, individualized by colour

The bay-and-gable design was first employed on freestanding, detached homes in Toronto, although the design was later adopted with semi-detached homes. From the mid-to-late 19th century, the semi-detached bay-and-gable design became a popular residential style with developers and residents in Toronto. The design was widely adopted for several reasons; due to its efficient use of spaces and windows and local building materials, the design's ability to be easily mass-produced, and because it could be adapted for stand-alone buildings, semi-detached, or as terrace houses. Bay-and-gable homes were viewed by its occupants as a home whose façade could be improved and somewhat individualized with minimal investment. Most homes were further decorated by homeowners to some degree with additional bargeboards with detailing, terracotta tiles, or stained-glass windows. Conversely, the housing form was viewed by property developers as particularly cheap and efficient buildings to build, as well as scale down on narrow properties. The housing form were typically built to take advantage of the length of a narrow property, with the length of some bay-and-gable homes extending 46 metres (150 ft) in length. The average lot for most bay-and-gables are 5.5 by 39.3 metres (18 ft × 129 ft).

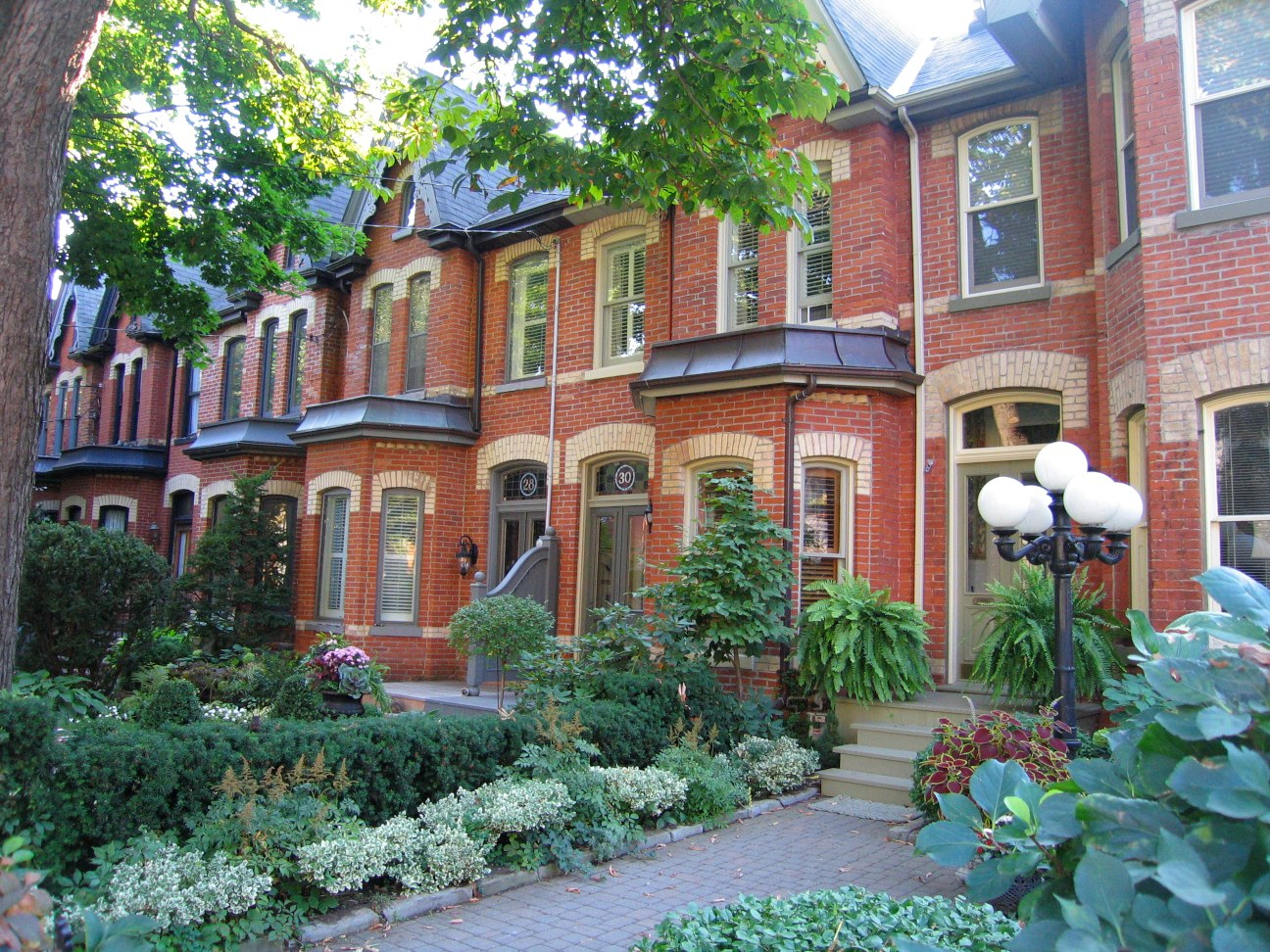
Terraced half-bay-and-gable. The half-bay-and-gable is a variant of the housing form, where the bay window only fronts the first level, and does not extend to the roof.

Most 19th-century bay-and-gables have the lines of the two-storey bay window aligned with the crowning gable of the home, the bay window often taking up more than half the front of the façade of the house; resulting in most bay-and-gables to appear skinny, but tall. The use of large bay windows are necessary to allow natural light to reach the depths of narrow lots, and to allow air to circulate; a necessity for 19th-century homes that had coal-burning fireplaces. To allow light into the home, many bay-and-gables had their kitchen wings narrowed compared to the front of the home, allowing for windows to be placed in the rear. Windows were also placed on top of the front door to further increase the amount of natural light that entered the building. However, variants of the style exist, where the bay window only fronts the first level of the building. The half-bay-and-gable variant is typically used to allow for a balcony to extend along the frontage of the second level. The variant is also used for smaller lots, with the two-storey bay window variant requiring a larger lot size. The front façade of most bay and gables also typically feature carved gable boards, supporting brackets, and Italianate and Gothic architectural ornamentation. Many semi-detached and terraced bay-and-gable homes in Toronto had polychromatic brickwork around its windows and gables, a common element of High Victorian Gothic architecture.

The bay-and-gable design has proliferated throughout Toronto, becoming a ubiquitous style found in many of the city's neighbourhoods. The term bay-and-gable was first coined by historian Patricia McHugh, in her 1985 book Toronto: A City Guide.

=== Semi-detached ===
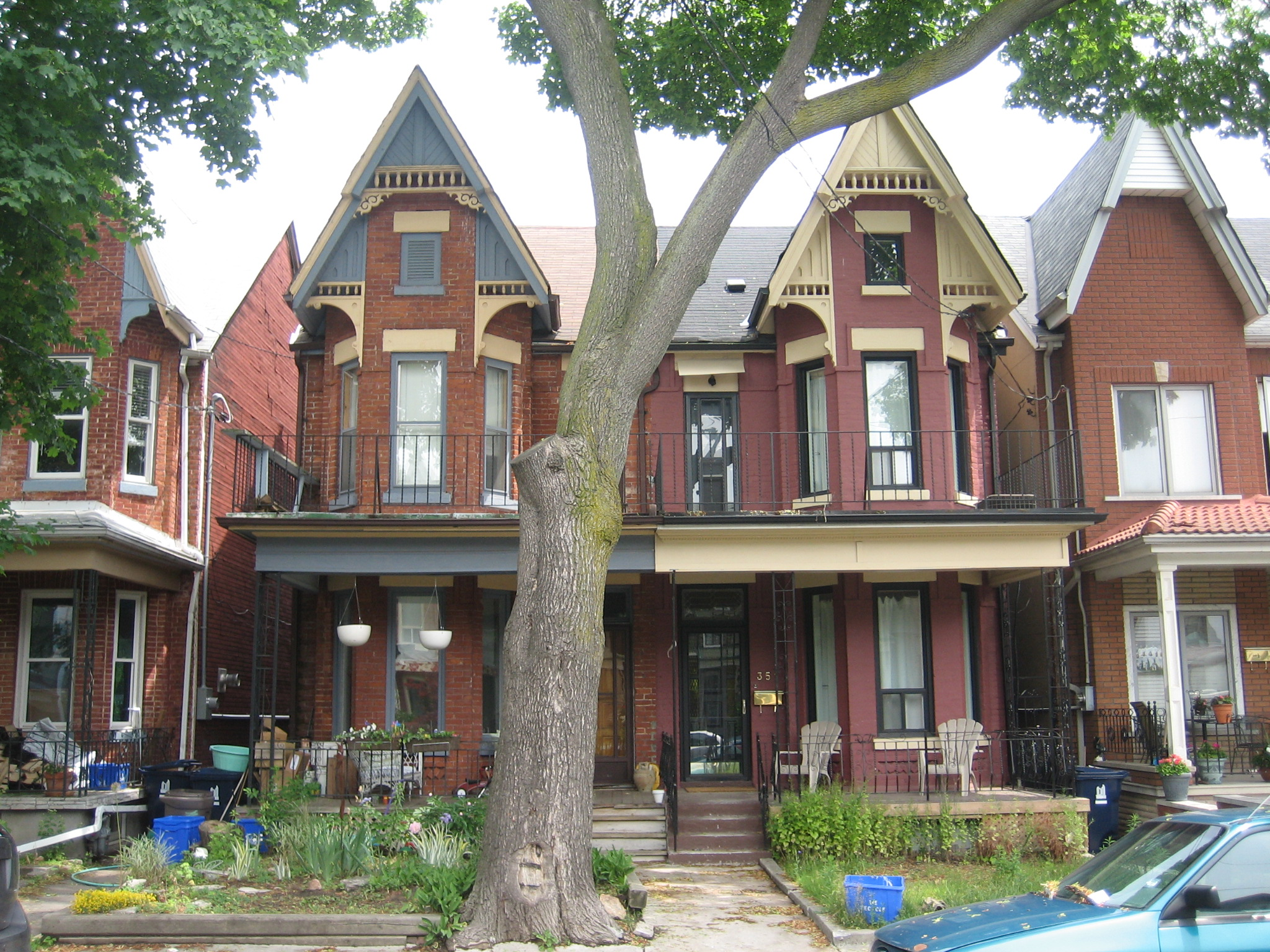
A semi-detached bay-and-gable with a front porch built at the front entrance

Semi-detached bay-and-gables from the mid-to-late 19th century typically featured a two-and-one-half-storey façade clad in brick; with a ground-floor bay window fronting the principal room and its entrance sheltered by a small porch. The second level is typically flat with two or three windows aligned with the bay window and doorway on the level below it. The gabled roof is centred over the bay windows on the ground level.

Although these architects sought to replicate early Elizabethan and Gothic designs, the interior of many of these structures was based on Georgian-styled terrace houses that were common in Toronto during the period. This resulted in a Tudor-like structure with Gothic elements, that was "overlaid onto a common Georgian mews house plan". However, the arrangements of the interior were dependent on the budget and the width of the property lot; the width of most late-19th century semi-detached bay-and-gables ranging from 3.7 to 7.6 metres (12 to 25 ft). Semi-detached bay-and-gables built on narrower properties typically only had windows on two sides of the structure; although older variants of the design built on larger properties were afforded windows on three sides of the structure. The interior ground level of a semi-detached bay-and-gable unit typically included a side hall opening into two small or one large room, with an offset kitchen wing in the rear of the house. In the narrowest semi-detached bay-and-gables, a flight of stairs providing access to the second level of the unit is typically placed in the front section of the hall.

== History ==
=== Background ===
Architects based in Toronto in the 19th century were largely influenced by the architectural literary works published in that period, including Andrew Jackson Downing's Architecture of Country Houses, Francis Goodwin's Rural Architecture, John Claudius Loudon's Encyclopedia of Cottage, Farm and Villa Architecture, and Robert Lugar's Architectural Sketches for Cottages, Rural Dwellings, and Villas, in the Grecian, Gothic, and Fancy Styles. The English Antique/Elizabethan and Gothic architectural styles described in these works served as the foundations for the development of bay-and-gable; namely the symmetrical arrangement of twin gables, cross-gabled roofs, and a central entrance.

The adoption of Elizabethan and Gothic elements into the bay-and-gable design is largely credited to the emergence of an upwardly mobile middle class in Toronto, and their desire to replicate the styling commonly associated with "old money" country homes; as opposed to adopting Neoclassical designs commonly associated with "new money" during that period. In particular, the descendants of the United Empire Loyalists in Upper Canada preferred using architectural styles that were popular in the United Kingdom, like Elizabethan and Gothic; as opposed to the Greek Revival style of architecture that was popular in the United States during the same period.

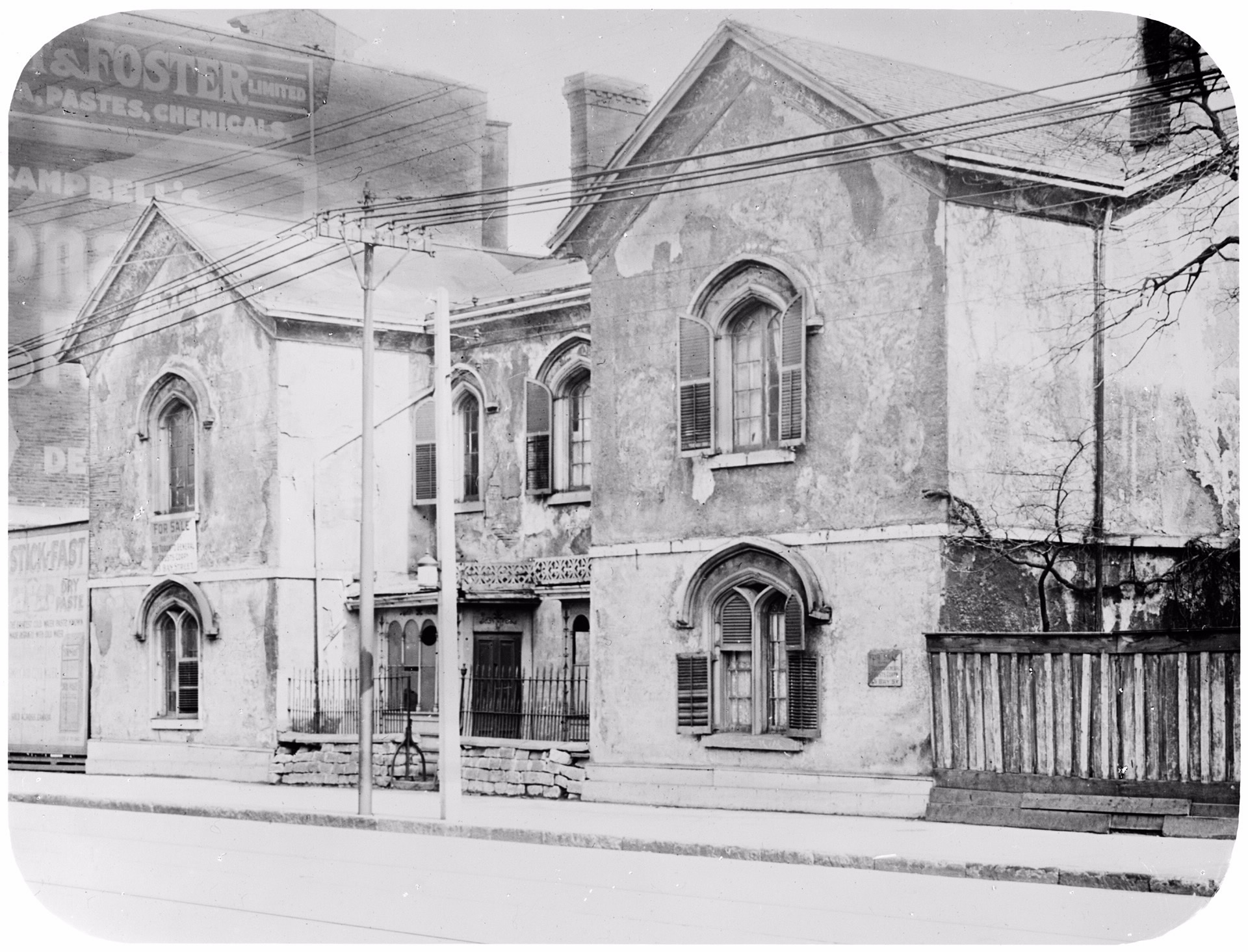
Berkeley House in Toronto prior to its demolition in 1924. The bay-and-gable design is believed to have been influenced by 19th-century villas like Berkeley House.

Most residences in Toronto during the early 19th century were two-or-three-storey Georgian-styled homes, although a small number of English-styled villas were also built in the city, such as the two-gabled wing Berkeley House. However, the larger adoption of other architectural styles in Toronto only emerged after William Thomas moved from the UK to Toronto in 1841, and became the city's third working architect. Thomas quickly built his own home in Toronto, the symmetrical English-styled Oakham House. The stylings of these English villas were later appropriated by local developers for mass-produced bay-and-gable homes in the mid-to-late 19th century; with the earliest bay-and-gable built retaining the massing of an Elizabethan villa, its gabled peaks, and Gothic ornaments throughout the buildings. However, the interiors of most bay-and-gables primarily copied the layouts of Georgian-styled terrace homes in Toronto, as opposed to the layout of an English villa.

=== 19th century models ===
The earliest known example of the bay-and-gable design is the Blaikie and Alexander houses at 404 Jarvis Street, designed by architectural firm Gundry and Langley and built in 1863. However, early examples of bay-and-gables, like the Blaikie and Alexander houses, retained more elements of an English villa than later bay-and-gable homes built in later decades. Developers like Gundry and Langley later produced a substantial number of detached one-and-a-half storey bay-and-gables during the 1870s; with many of these homes based in Cabbagetown, The Annex, and Yorkville. Many of these homes were built for the upper-middle class, and were designed to be customized for their occupants. The earliest semi-detached bay-and-gable was built on 33-35 Elm Street in 1871. Many of these homes were later used as models for mass-produced terraced bay-and-gables built for the working class during the late 19th century given the design's inexpensive but expressive facades. Earlier homes were influenced by a mix of Italianate and Gothic Revival elements, such as round-headed windows, angled bays, and steep gables.

During the latter half of the 19th century, Toronto underwent large population growth, resulting in a significant housing shortage in the city. The resulting shortage and demand for housing led to speculative developers building out rows of bay-and-gables in the city. The bay-and-gable style was selected by developers in Toronto as the design could be scaled to fit narrow lots, and could therefore be built in quantities that could keep pace with the population boom. These developments largely benefited from local investors, with housing developments being viewed as a safe investment amid the recession caused by the Panic of 1857.

Areas near the periphery of urbanized Toronto, like Cabbagetown, were viewed as ideal places to develop housing for Toronto's growing migrant population, leading to these areas being developed in large piecemeal fashion by speculative developers. During the building boom in the 1880s, nearly half of the 3,000 homes built in Cabbagetown were bay-and-gables, with many of these homes initially owned by a select number of speculative developers. Many mass-produced 19th century units only bricked the building's façade, with the building's largely being built on mass-produced timbers filled with furring strips, lath and stucco, or veneer. Mass-produced timber frames were used to speed up the construction of units without compromising the stability of the buildings; with developers having expected the eventual homeowners to brick the remaining portions when they could afford it. Many later opted to cover the wood siding with fake brick known as Insulbrick. Although early bay-and-gables were symmetrical and were built as mirrored pairs; by 1878, rows of identical semi-detached bay-and-gable units were built.

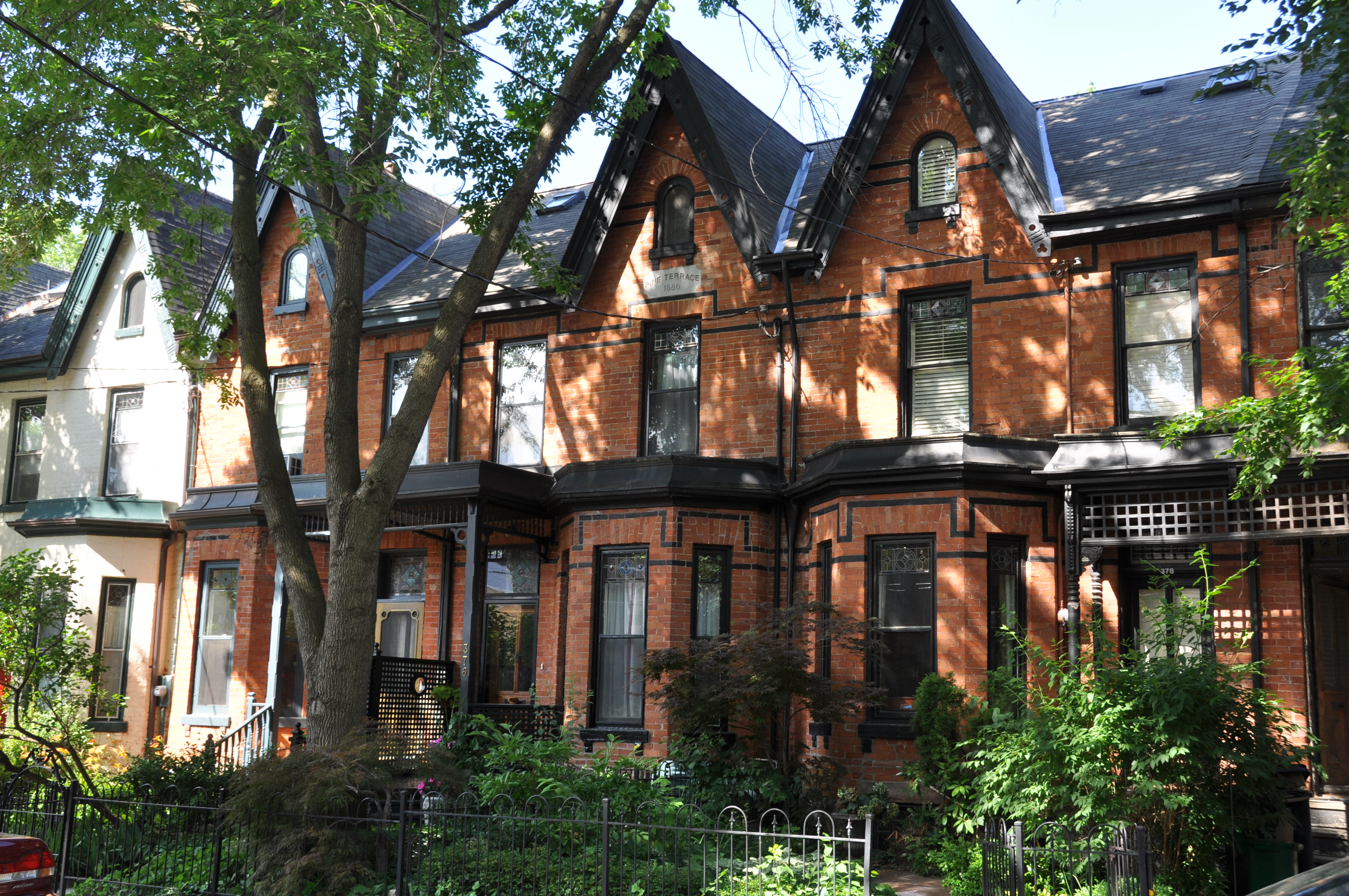
Row of half bay-and-gables bricked in red and white, a common colour used for the housing form in the 19th century

By the 1880s, some developers replaced the English villa elements with elements associated with Queen Anne style. Many of Toronto's 19th century bay-and-gables were fronted using either red or white bricks. The use of bright colours in Victorian-era homes was an attempt to offset the industrialized "grey soot" of the 19th century. During this period, new bay-and-gable models were built on narrower lots as the rapid development and speculation caused real estate prices in these former periphery areas to rise; resulting in the diminishment of the lot's width.

By 1895, most developers in Toronto had ceased to build mass-produced bay-and-gables; with several homeowners of the style making their own substantial changes to these structures.

Some bay-and-gable homes were demolished in downtown Toronto to make way for new developments during the 1960s. Several homes were also modified or reworked by the 1970s. However bay-and-gable homes remain common throughout the residential areas of downtown Toronto. In particular, Cabbagetown retained many bay-and-gable homes as local public housing authorities had used those homes during that period. Local appreciation for the bay-and-gable housing type did not emerge until several heritage conservation districts were established in the late 20th century; encouraging the restoration of the local streetscapes and the façade of these buildings.

=== Contemporary variants ===
During the late 20th century, the façade format of the bay-and-gable style remerged with new infill construction in the city, as it underwent another period of densification. These modern bay-and-gable variants are typically more tightly packed onto their lots than even traditional bay-and-gable homes; and feature square bay windows, use of a palette of contemporary building materials, and a flatter roof with a walkout.

During the early 21st century, in the neighbouring municipality of Markham, subdivisions were filled with bay-and-gable houses modified to incorporate a two-car garage.

== See also ==
- Architecture of Toronto
- Annex style house
- Gablefront house
