= Playter =

Playter is a surname. Notable people with the surname include:

- George Playter (1809–1866), Canadian Methodist minister, historian and writer
- Wellington A. Playter (1879–1937), English actor

== See also ==
- Playter Estates, an area of Toronto, Ontario, Canada
- William Playters (1590–1668), English politician
