= James Edward Small =

Canadian politician

Member of the Legislative Assembly of Upper Canada for York
- In office 1834–1844

Personal details
- Born: February 1798 York, Upper Canada
- Died: May 27, 1869 (aged 71) London, Ontario, Canada
- Party: Reform
- Occupation: lawyer, judge

James Edward Small, QC (February 1798 – May 27, 1869) was a lawyer, judge and political figure in Upper Canada and Canada West.

He was born in York, Upper Canada in 1798, the son of John Small. He attended the Home District School with Robert Baldwin. During the War of 1812, he served on the ship St. Lawrence.

On July 12, 1817, he was the second for John Ridout in a duel with Samuel Peters Jarvis. When Ridout fired his gun early at Jarvis, Small insisted that Ridout be allowed to re-load his gun. When Ridout was shot Small sought the assistance of George Playter. Small articled in law with William Warren Baldwin and was called to the bar in 1821.

In 1831 Small and his younger brother, Charles Coxwell Small, inherited their father's large house on the southwest corner of what is now Berkeley and King streets.

In 1834, he was elected to the Legislative Assembly of Upper Canada in Toronto. He was elected in an 1839 by-election in the 3rd riding of York; he was reelected to the Legislative Assembly of the Province of Canada in 1841. Small supported Robert Baldwin's call for responsible government; in 1842, he was named solicitor general for Canada West in the Baldwin-Lafontaine government. He was appointed Queen's Counsel in 1842. He resigned from his post as solicitor general in 1843. He was reelected in 1844 but was later disqualified and George Monro was declared elected. In 1849, he was appointed judge in Middlesex County.

He died in London, Ontario in 1869.

The Dictionary of Canadian Biography, while noting Small was born into a life of privilege, had nevertheless allied himself with relatively liberal figures, like his school chum, Robert Baldwin, Upper Canada's prime advocate for responsible government.
