= Small's Creek =

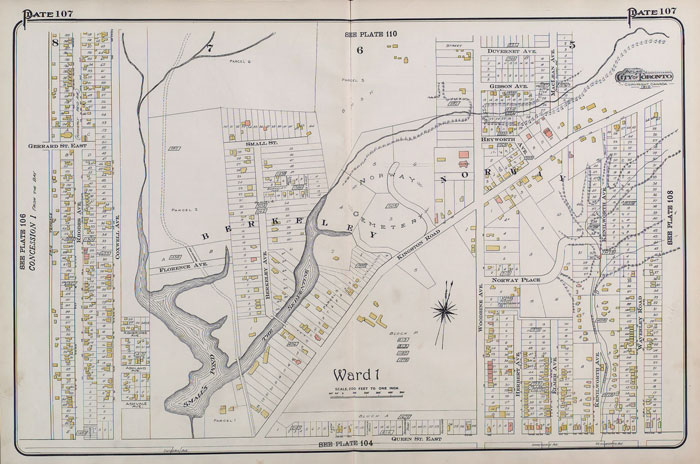
- Small's Creek flowed into Small's Pond

Location
- Country: Canada
- State: Ontario
- Municipality: Toronto

Physical characteristics
- Mouth: Smalls Pond
- Length: 2 km (1.2 mi)

Small's Creek was one of the three watercourses that flowed into Small's Pond, a small body of water of several acres in area, located near the intersection of Queen Street and Kingston Road, in Toronto, Ontario. There is a small plain between the shore of Lake Ontario and the bluffs which marked the shore of the larger Glacial Lake Iroquois, and bedrock was shallow on the plain. Small's Creek, Tomlin's Creek, the other watercourse that drains into Small's Pond, and Ashbridge's Creek to the east were all small, short watercourses, with their headwaters on that small plain, had each become polluted by the turn of the 20th century, when the regions they flowed through were annexed into the growing city of Toronto.

A gentleman farmer named Charles Coxwell Small, who was also the Clerk of Upper Canada's Privy Council, dammed creeks to create a millpond to power sawmills on his property, and the pond and one of the creeks were named after him.

After a few years of debate, in 1909, the three creeks were buried, and turned into sewers. Small's Pond also became polluted, and was drained and filled in, in 1935.
