= Ashbridge's Creek =

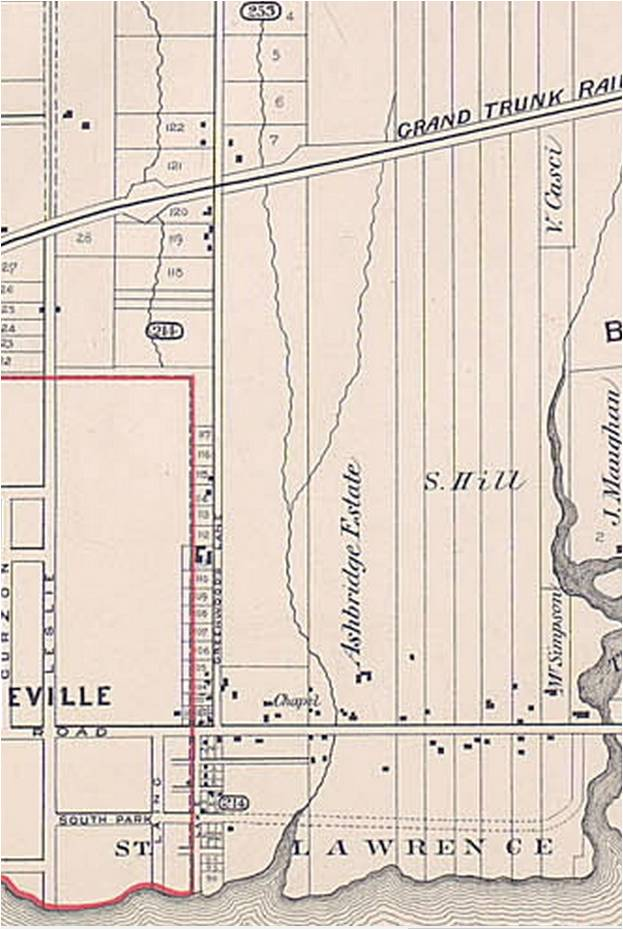

Location
- Country: Canada
- State: Ontario
- Municipality: Toronto

Physical characteristics
- Mouth: Ashbridge's Bay, Lake Ontario
- Length: 4 km (2.5 mi)

Ashbridge's Creek was a watercourse that flowed in Ashbridge's Bay, between the Don River and Highland Creek. Its headwaters were north of Greenwood and Danforth avenues, making it about 4 kilometres (2.5 miles) long.

The creek was buried, and converted to a sewer, in 1909, together with nearby Smalls Creek, and Tomlin's Creek, shortly after their communities they ran through were annexed by the growing city of Toronto.

Portions of a fence the Ashbridge family erected along the creek, to keep their cattle from polluting it, survive to the present day, near Craven Road.
