= John Small (Upper Canada politician) =

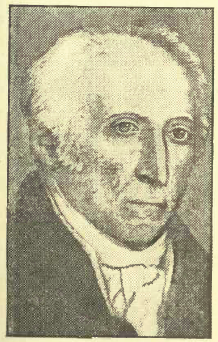
- Born: August 27, 1746; Cirencester, England
- Died: July 18, 1831 (aged 84); York, Upper Canada
- Children: James Edward Small; Charles Coxwell Small

John Small (August 27, 1746 – July 18, 1831) was a political figure in Upper Canada.

== Life and career ==
Small was born in 1746 at Cirencester in England. In 1792, he was appointed clerk of the Executive Council of Upper Canada. He was also a justice of the peace and a lieutenant in the militia.

He came to Canada with John Graves Simcoe and built one of the first residential homes in the town of York (now Toronto). His son Charles Coxwell Small expanded the home, which was later called Berkeley House. It was a prominent local building until it was torn down during the 1920s and turned into a brewery.

In January 1800, he fought a duel with John White, the attorney general for the province. White had insulted Small's wife's honour after a quarrel between the two men's wives. Small shot White in the hip, a wound he died from a few days later. He was charged with and acquitted of murder, even though the presiding judge, Henry Allcock, claimed to be a friend of White. Small's reputation in the elite society of York was ruined by the affair.

As a result of land speculation, Small was able to achieve some level of prosperity. He died at York in 1831.

His elder son, James Edward Small, served in the legislative assemblies of Upper Canada and of the Province of Canada. His younger son, Charles Coxwell Small, followed in his father's footsteps as Chief Clerk. His grandson, also named John Small, served in the parliament of the Province of Canada and in the Parliament of Canada after Confederation.
