= Tomlin's Creek =

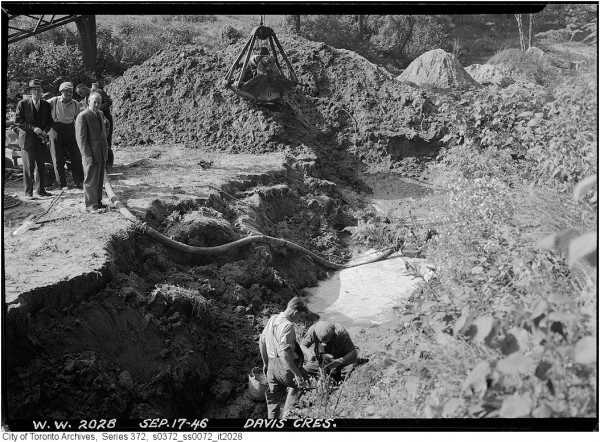
- After it was buried, and converted into a sewer, tiny springs keep breaking out at the creek's old headwaters.

- Historic location of the mouth of the creek in Toronto

Location
- Country: Canada
- State: Ontario
- Municipality: Toronto

Physical characteristics
- Mouth: Small's Pond
  - coordinates: 43.6795°N 79.300°W
- Length: 1 km (0.62 mi)

Tomlin's Creek is short creek in Toronto, which drained into Small's Pond. Its headwaters seem to have been in the ravine that contains Glen Davis Crescent, because residents report small springs breaking out.

In the 19th century Tomlin's Creek, a smaller creek with no name, and a larger creek that came to be known as Small's Creek, lay on a large parcel of land owned by Charles Coxwell Small, a gentleman farmer and prominent public official in Upper Canada. Just north of the present location of Queen Street, Small had a dam built to create a millpond to power sawmills. That millpond came to be known as Small's Pond.

Tomlin's Creek, and the other tributaries to Small's Pond, remained clean until the end of the 19th century. The pond had become popular for swimming and fishing in the summer, and slabs of ice were harvested during the winter. But the surrounding area was annexed into the growing city of Toronto and, with increased urbanization, the creeks were quickly polluted, and the decision was made to bury the creeks and convert them to sewers.

Residents who live near the spring outcroppings fear the development of dangerous sinkholes. During winter, the water from the springs flows down the street and freezes, making for dangerous driving conditions when all other streets are clear.
