= Burke Brook =

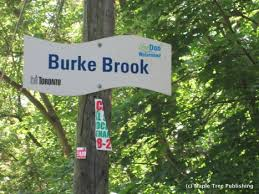

- Location of the mouth of the creek in Toronto

Location
- Country: Canada
- State: Ontario
- Region: Greater Toronto Area
- City: Toronto

Physical characteristics
- Source
  - location: Glenview Senior Public School, Canada
  - coordinates: 43.720583°N 79.408013°W
  - elevation: 178 m (584 ft)
- Mouth: Don River
  - location: Sunnybrook Park, Canada
  - coordinates: 43.720586°N 79.365653°W
  - elevation: 134 m (440 ft)
- Length: 9 km (5.6 mi)

Basin features
- River system: Don River
- Tributaries
  - left: North Toronto Storm Trunk Sewer

Burke Brook is a small stream in Toronto, Ontario. It is part of the Don River watershield, a major river that flows into Lake Ontario. The north end of the stream begins near Glenview Senior Public School.

== History ==
Burke Brooke used to start near Downsview Airport. The stream then went in a southeast direction to where it met the beginning of the stream today (just east of Glenview Senior Public School). After that the stream followed the current course to where it meets the West Don River. The total length of the stream was 9 kilometres (5.6 mi), with 6 kilometres (3.7 mi) being tributaries.

== Tributaries ==
=== Havergal Stream ===
Havergal Stream runs entirely through the property of Havergal College girls' school. The start of the stream is fed by local sewers and nearby springs. The Havergal Stream then proceeds to meet the North Toronto Storm Trunk Sewer at the edge of the school property. The water of the stream flows into the North Toronto Storm Trunk Sewer, where the sewer meets the Burke Brook.

Havergal Stream used to start under the intersection of Old Orchard Grove and Barse Street by the Baycrest Hospital. The length of the river was 1.5 kilometres (0.93 mi). The river left its source and proceeded in a south-south-east direction to the current grounds of Havergal College, where nowadays it pops ups from the ground. The stream then went to where the current North Toronto Storm Trunk Sewer is and then met the Burke Brook a little east of there.

=== North Toronto Storm Trunk Sewer ===
The North Toronto Storm Trunk Sewer is a storm sewer location in North York, Toronto, Ontario. The sewer has two sections: one starts at Lawrence Avenue and follows the old Burke Brooke, and the other starts at Douglass Avenue and Bathurst Street. The North Toronto Storm Trunk Sewer was a Metropolitan Toronto project installed during the 1960s and 70s. Like other sewers build at that time, it was intended to help reduce sewage along the planned route for the Spadina Expressway. It was also intended to allow particle sewage separation in suburban boroughs served by smaller sewage plants and to open up more land for development. The sewer also links to the North York Storm Trunk Sewer by Douglass Avenue and Bathurst Street. The North Toronto Storm Trunk Sewer meets the Burke Brooke where it starts near Glenview Senior Public School

=== Former tributaries ===
The Burke Brook used to have a total of 6 kilometres (3.7 mi) of tributary streams.

==== Blythwood Stream ====
Blythwood Stream, which started by Glengowan Road and Strathgowan and also at Saint Leonards Avenue and Saint Ives Avenue. It is the closest tributary to the Don River. The two section merged at Strathgowan Road and Fidelia Avenue. The stream followed a course running just east of Blythdale Road almost parallel until it met Burke Brook. The length of the stream was around 1 kilometre (0.62 mi).

==== Lawrence Park Stream ====
Lawrence Park Stream merged with the McDougall Stream by the Locke Library between Lawrence and Lympstone. The length of the Lawrence Park stream was 6 kilometres (3.7 mi) and the McDougall Stream was 1 kilometre (0.62 mi). The Lawrence Park Stream started by Wilson Avenue and Avenue Road, then headed to the point where it met the McDougall Stream, then it continued to the east side of Yonge Street to meet the Burke Brook near Yonge Street and Saint Edmunds Drive. The McDougall stream started just north of the Blythwood Stream and curved north and west to where it met the Lawrence Park Stream.

== Parks ==
Parks are in order from east to west.

=== Sunnybrook Park ===
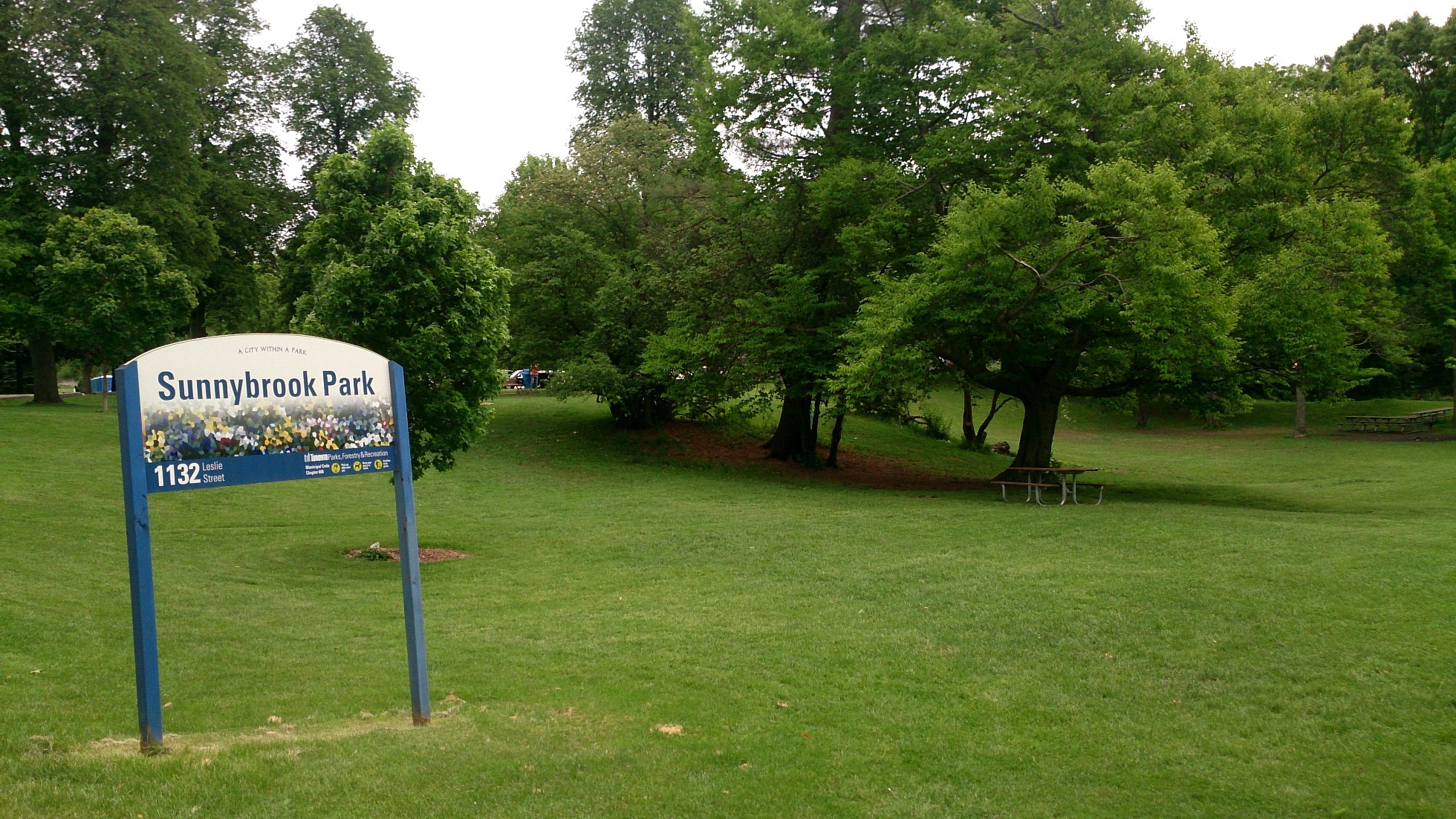
Sunnybrook Park

Sunnybrook Park is a major park in Toronto that connects to the Don Valley from the west. It is home to the Sunnybrook Stables, dog parks, and many sport fields. There are also many bike and walking paths, with a few car-accessible roads scattered throughout. The park is also known for its cricket.

=== Burke Brook Ravine ===
The Burke Brook Ravine is a ravine that stretches from Sunnybrook Park to Bayview Avenue. The ravine has no official trail connection to Bayview Avenue but is accessible from Bayview Avenue by steeply sloping paths.

=== Sunnydene Park ===
Sunnydene Park is a small park just to the east of Sherwood Park, to the west of Bayview Avenue. The park is near Sherwood Park and maps include it as part of Sherwood Park

=== Sherwood Park ===
Sherwood Park is a park in Toronto. It contains a city maintenance building, a water park, a playground, and washrooms. It contains 2 paths to the left and right of the Burke Brook. It contains a dog-off-leash park to the south-east north of the Mount Hope Catholic Cemetery and west of Sunnydene Park. To the north of the park is Blythwood Road and the Blythwood Ravine. A road leads west out of the park to Sherwood Avenue.

=== Blythwood Ravine Park ===
Blythwood Ravine Park is a ravine between Alexander Muir Memorial Gardens and Blythwood Road. It also has entrances and the end of Strathgowan Avenue and Glengowan Road. The park is quite skinny and acts as a connector park between Sherwood park and Alexander Muir Memorial Gardens/ Yonge Street.

=== Alexander Muir Memorial Gardens ===
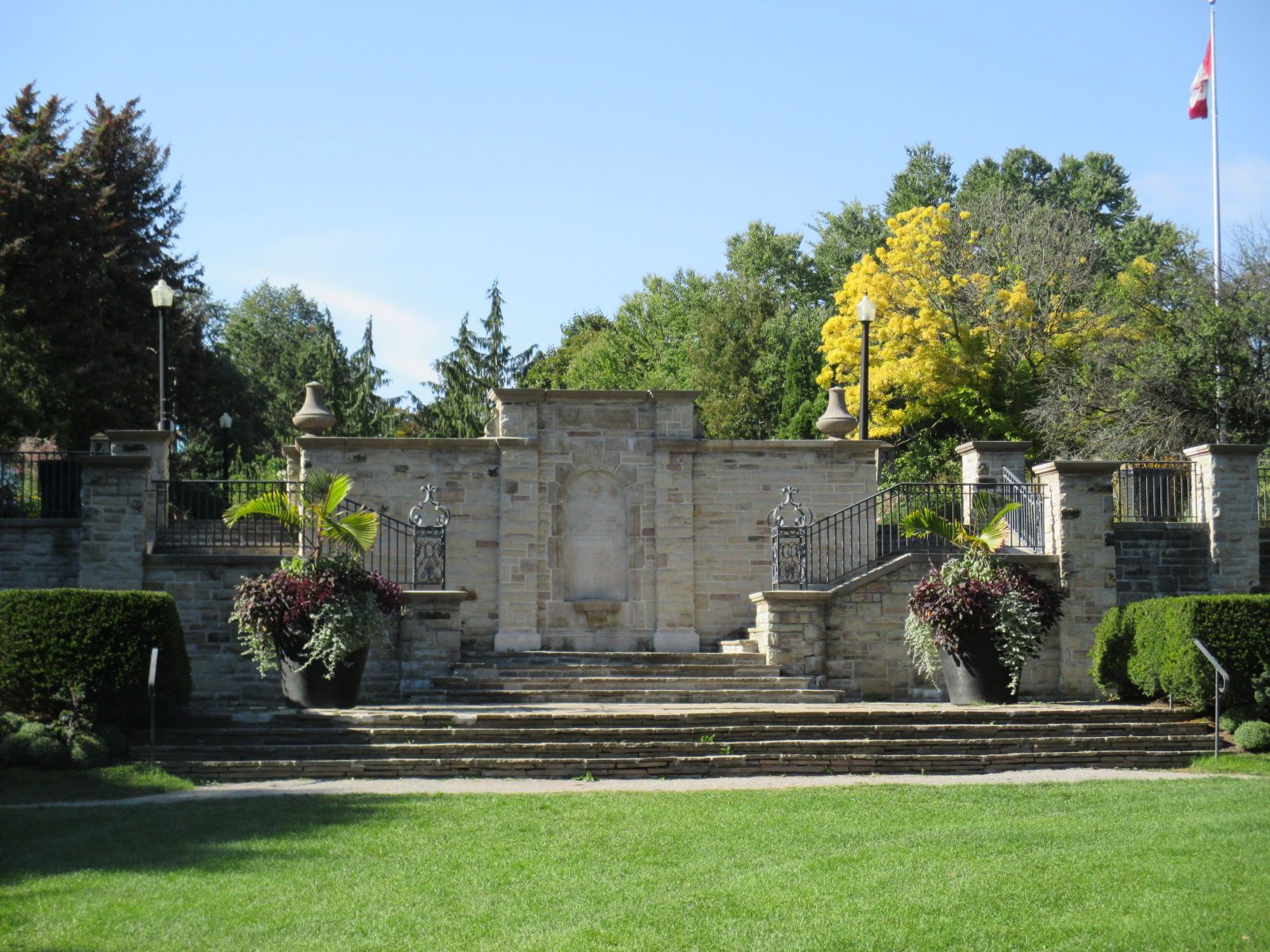
The wall with the song Maple Leaf Forever on it at Alexander Muir Memorial Gardens

This park is between Blythwood Ravine Park and Yonge Street. It contains the tennis courts of the Lawrence Park Tennis Club and the fields of the Lawrence Park Lawn Bowling and Croquet Club. The main attraction of the park is the song The Maple Leaf Forever, a patriotic song about Canada, by Alexander Muir, printed on a stone wall with stairs connected to the fields and gardens of the park. The park was originally located on the west side of Yonge Street across from the Mount Pleasant Cemetery to celebrate the Toronto centennial celebrations. To build the Yonge Subway the TTC paid over $100,000 to move the park, including the stone wall, to its current location in Lawrence Park.

=== Duplex Parkette/Glenview Parkette ===
Duplex Parkette is located between Yonge Street and Duplex Avenue south of Chatsworth Drive. Burke Brooke runs in underground pipes through the entirety of the park. Just south of Duplex Parkette is Glenview Parkette. A small part consisting of two small flower gardens with pathways running through them.

=== Chatsworth Ravine ===
Chatsworth is a ravine between Duplex Avenue and Glenview Senior Public School with a path running to Cheritan Avenue. It has a bridge in the middle moving the path from south of the river to north of the river.

== Street crossings ==
In order from east to west:

- Bayview Avenue - No traffic/pedestrian lights (Kilgour Road has the closest Traffic light)
- Blythwood Road - Pedestrian crossing lights
- Mount Pleasant Road - path goes under a bridge
- Yonge Street - No traffic/ pedestrian lights (Saint Edmunds Drive has closest traffic lights)
- Duplex Avenue - No traffic lights (Glenview Avenue has closest pedestrian crossings (stop sign))
