= Jackson Creek (Toronto) =

Canadian river

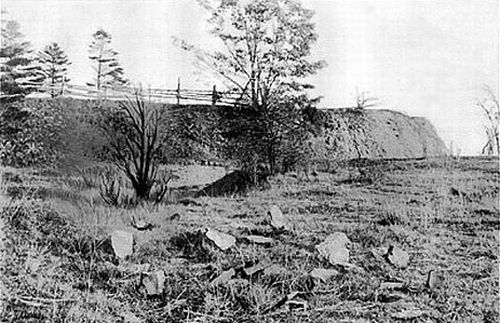
- Mouth of Jackson Creek, circa 1900

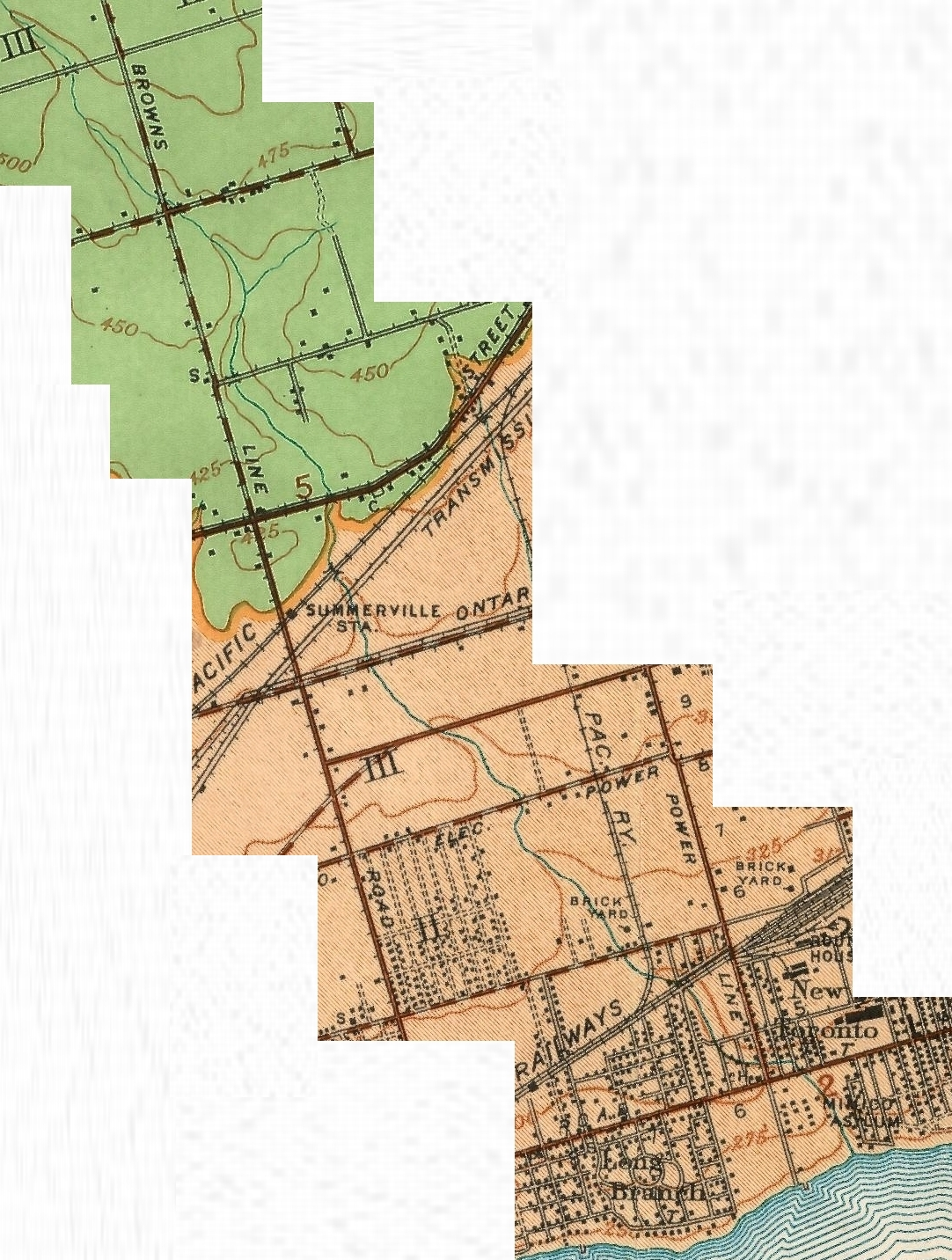
- Jackson Creek in Etobicoke, Ontario

- Location of the mouth of the creek in Toronto
- Etymology: Named for Jackson Farm, the historical location of its mouth

Location
- Country: Canada
- Province: Ontario
- Region: Greater Toronto Area
- Municipality: Toronto

Physical characteristics
- Source: ditch
  - location: Islington-City Centre West
  - coordinates: 43°37′27″N 79°32′53″W
  - elevation: 113 m (371 ft)
- Mouth: Lake Ontario
  - location: New Toronto
  - coordinates: 43°35′39″N 79°30′23″W
  - elevation: 74 m (243 ft)

Basin features
- River system: Great Lakes Basin

Jackson Creek is a watercourse that flows into Lake Ontario near 10th Street, in the New Toronto neighbourhood of Etobicoke, a suburb of Toronto, Ontario, Canada. It is part of the Great Lakes Basin. Its headwaters were approximately five kilometers northwest—north of Bloor Street, near Highway 427. Portions of the watercourse remain above-ground today. The creek is named for Jackson Farm, the historical location of its mouth.

Even though lost, for now, Jackson Creek is a strong candidate for day-lighting with grassroots movements and official proceedings backing the move.

The creek west of Jackson Creek is North Creek, while the creek east of Jackson Creek is Superior Creek.

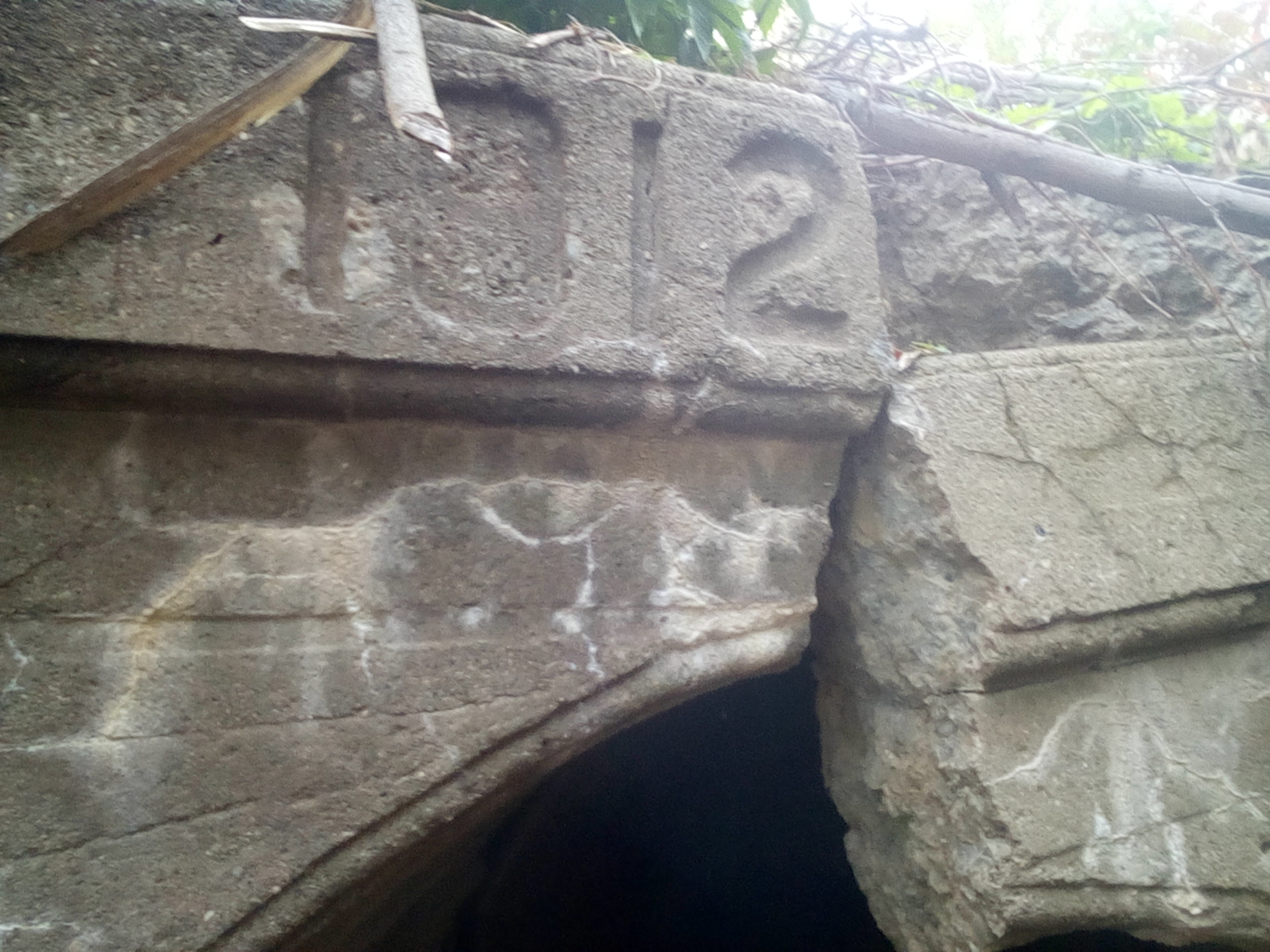
Now dry bridge underneath Canpa Rail Spur

== See also ==
- List of rivers of Ontario
