= North Creek (Toronto) =

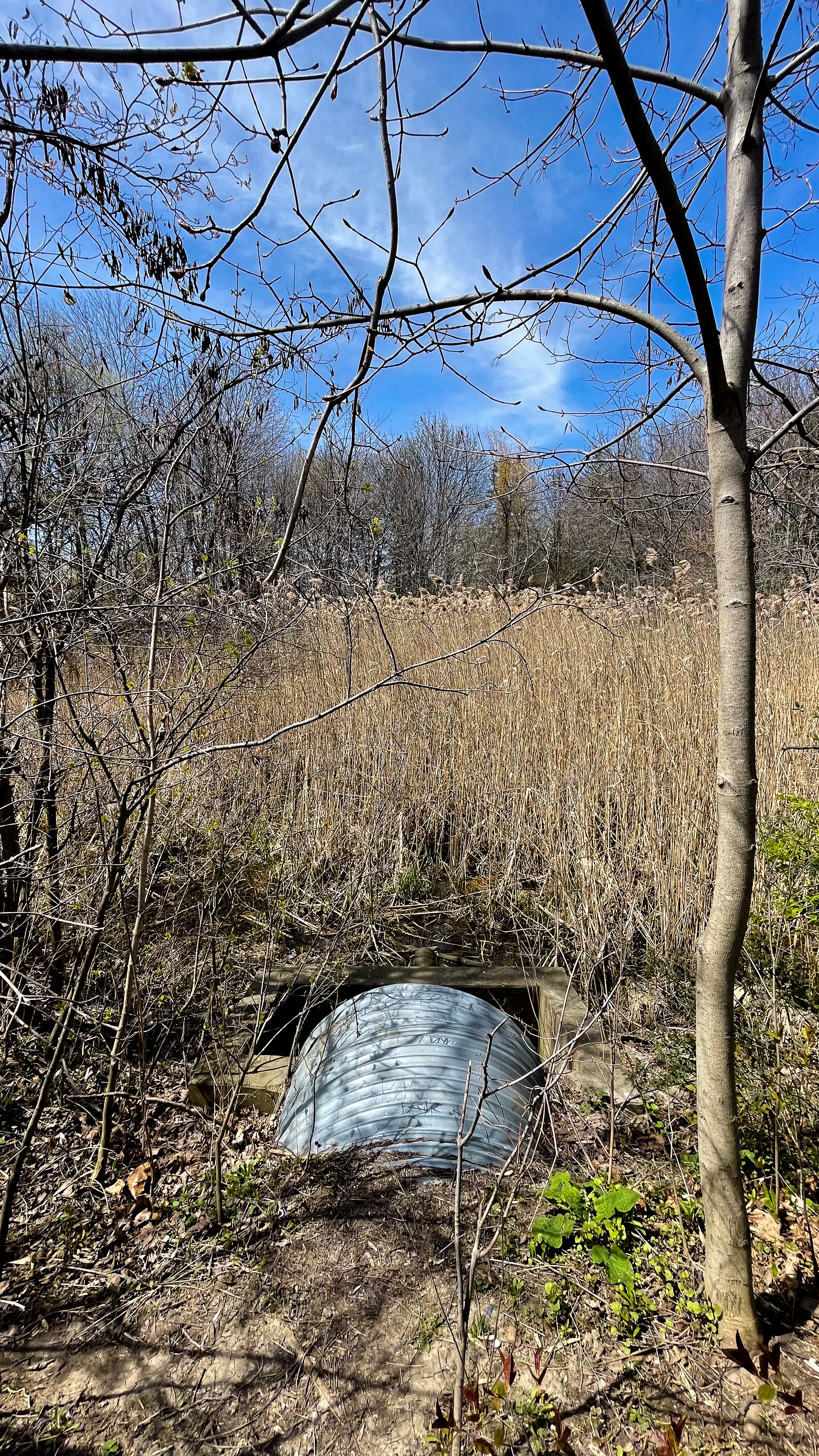

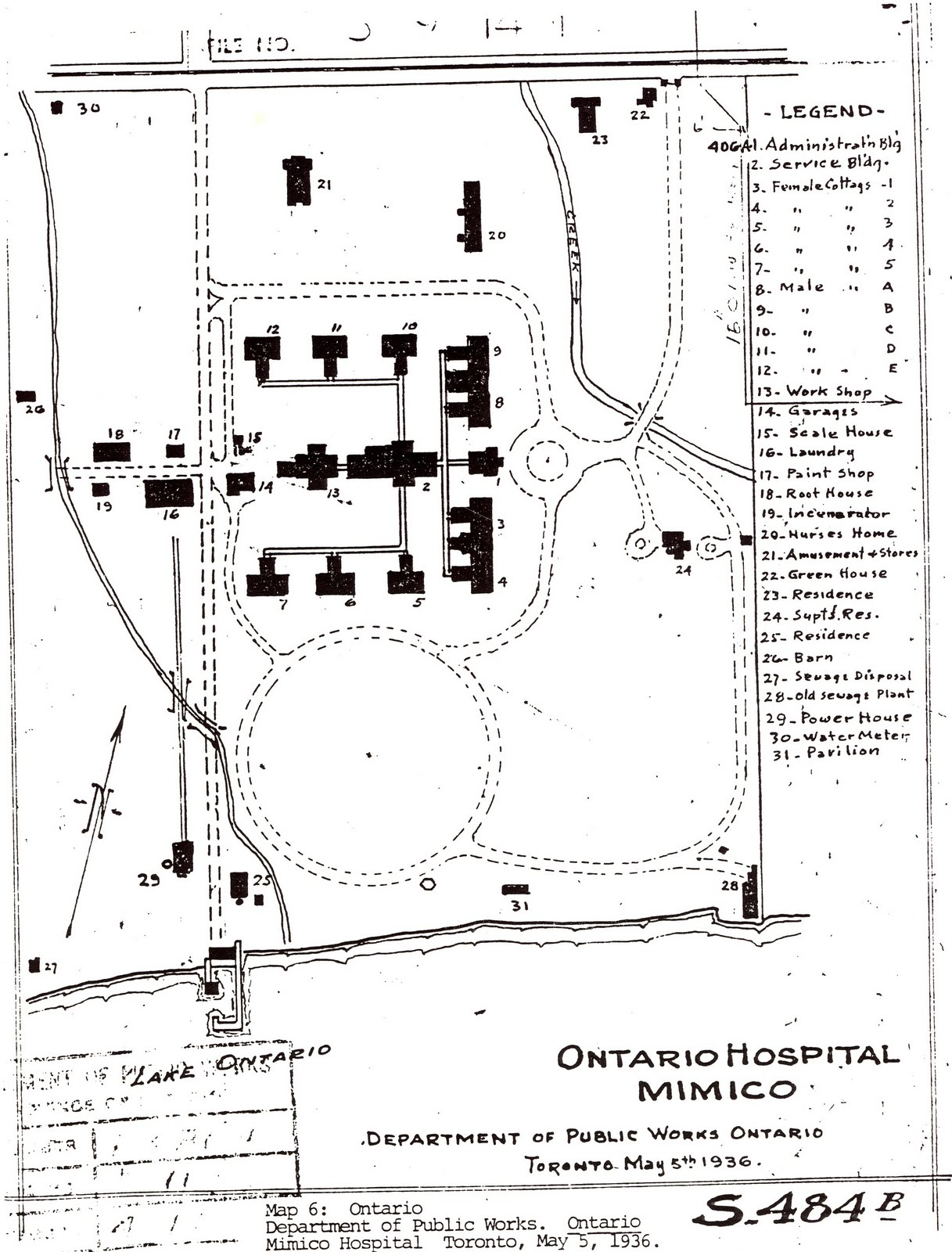

Location
- Country: Canada
- Province: Ontario
- Region: Greater Toronto Area
- Municipality: Toronto

Physical characteristics
- Source: ditch
  - location: Alderwood
- Mouth: Lake Ontario
  - location: New Toronto
  - coordinates: 43°35′34″N 79°30′50″W
  - elevation: 74 m (243 ft)

Basin features
- River system: Great Lakes Basin

North Creek is a mostly buried watercourse that flows into Lake Ontario on the grounds of the former Lakeshore Psychiatric Hospital now in Colonel Samuel Smith Park. Its mouth was at Kipling Avenue. Its headwaters were near the present day intersection of the Queen Elizabeth Way and Browns Line. Almost all the creek had been buried by 1960, but part of the creek remains and mouth now flows in an easterly direction instead of southerly into Lake Ontario.

The mouth of Etobicoke Creek was approximately 2.5 km to the west of the mouth of North Creek. The mouth of Jackson Creek was approximately 700 m to the east of the mouth of North Creek.

== See also ==
- List of rivers of Ontario
- Jackson Creek (Toronto)
