= Berkeley House, York, Upper Canada =

Coordinates: 43.65149°N 79.36444°W

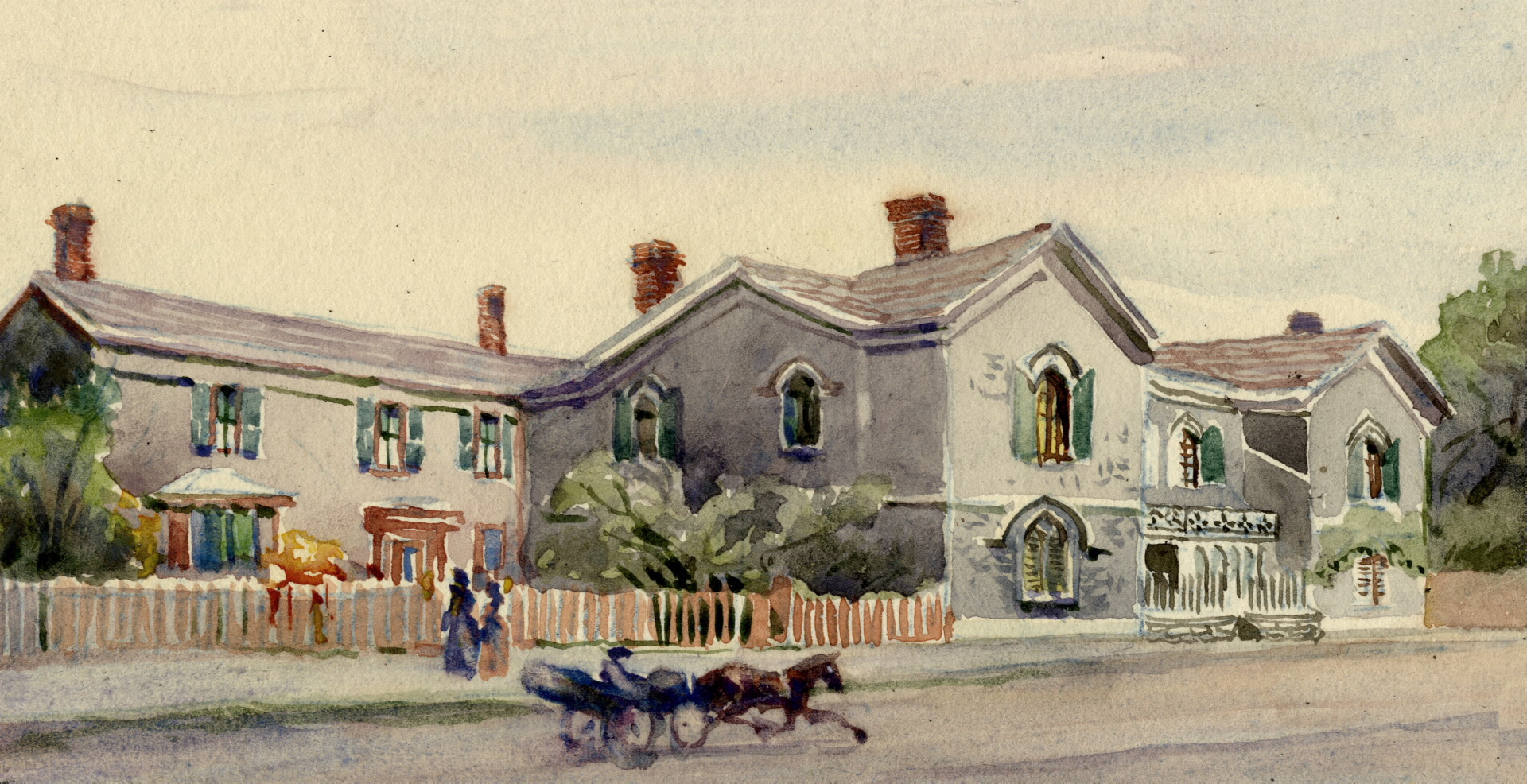
1924 painting of Berkeley House, based on a pencil sketch made in 1831 by Mrs. Charles C. Small

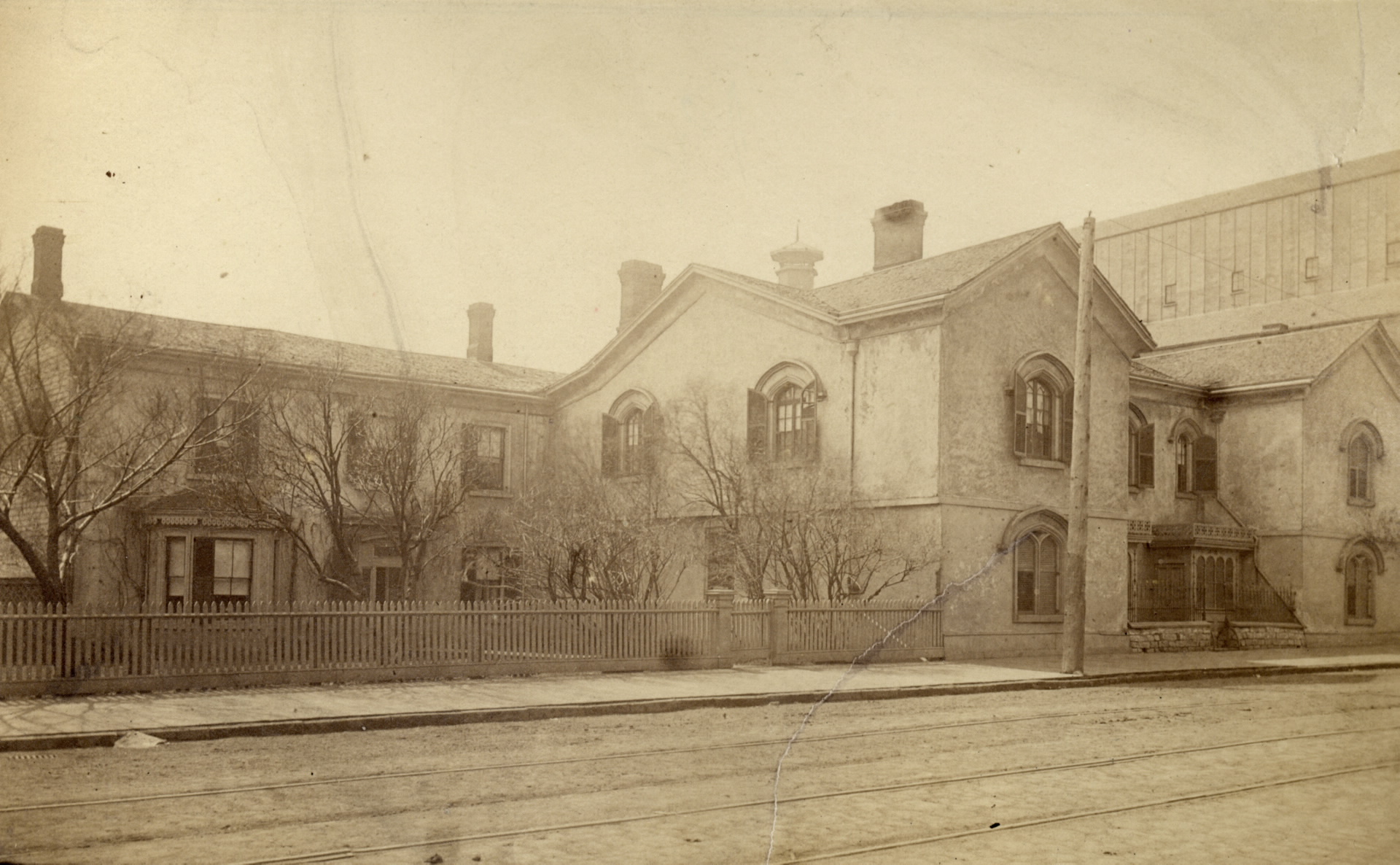
1885 photograph of Berkeley House

Berkeley House was a prominent house in York, Upper Canada. It was the home of two Clerks of Upper Canada's Privy Council – John Small, and his son Charles Coxwell Small. Upper Canada's first small Parliament buildings were built next door to Berkeley House. Small is reported to have hosted meetings of the province's executive committee in his home.

== History ==
In 1795, John Small bought a one-acre parcel of land with a large log cabin on it, which he covered in stucco and expanded. The original log cabin had been built in 1793 by George Porter, a self described former militia sergeant. Small paid Porter $50 for the property.

Charles Coxwell Small further expanded the house as an Italianate villa that became the centre of 1820s social life in York, after he inherited the property in 1831. It included multiple large rooms, including one 18x45 feet.

The building was demolished in 1925. It is now site of the Globe and Mail Centre.

Henry Scadding, an early resident of York, whose Toronto of Old recorded his recollections of York and early Toronto, devoted most of a page to describing Berkeley House, the renovations it went through, and early maps of the property. He described the early house existing in a clearing, east of King Street's eastern termination at Ontario Street. He described Charles Small expanding and "elevating" the original log cabin, and incorporating it into the expanded building. One of the maps bore the annotation "A sketch showing the land occupied by John Small, Esq., upon the Reserve appropriated for the Government House at York by His Excellency Lt. Gov. Simcoe."

== See also ==
- List of demolished buildings and structures in Toronto
- List of oldest buildings and structures in Toronto
