= Superior Creek =

Former stream in Ontario, Canada

Coordinates: 43°36′52″N 79°29′10″W

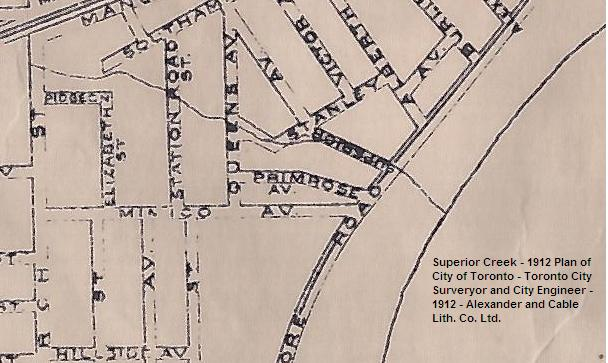
Superior Creek

Superior Creek was a stream draining into Lake Ontario in the former village of Mimico, Ontario, Canada. It was approximately 3 kilometres (1.9 mi) long, with headwaters near the present intersection of Kipling Avenue and the Queensway. The lower reaches of the creek had become polluted, and were buried in a sewer in 1915. In 1954, citizens of Mimico living in newly built houses near the upper reaches complained that the creek flooded, and lobbied to have the creek replaced by storm sewers, and a study was prepared. According to HTO: Toronto's Water from Lake Iroquois to Lost Rivers to Low-flow Toilets, the creek was buried around 1965.

The creek west of Superior Creek was Jackson Creek, while the creek east of Superior Creek was Mimico Creek.

== See also ==
- List of rivers of Ontario
