= Charles Coxwell Small =

Canadian farmer and public official

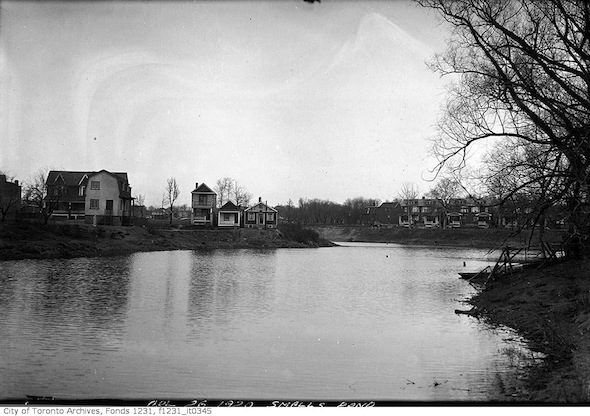
Small's Pond was named after Charles Coxwell Small.

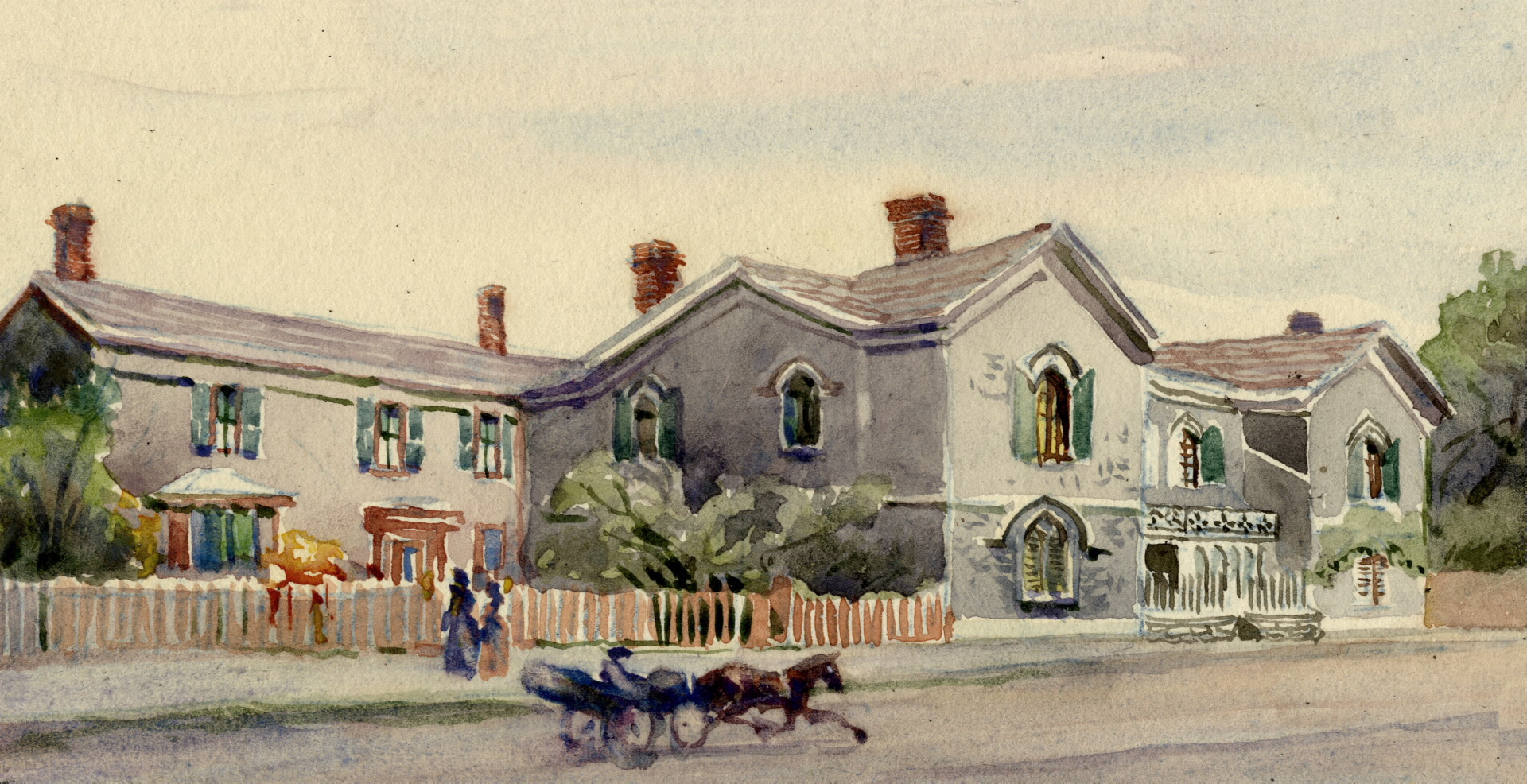
This painting of Berkeley House is based on a drawing Small's wife made in 1831.

Charles Coxwell Small (b 1801) was a wealthy farmer and public official in Upper Canada. Like his father, John Small, Small was the Chief Clerk of Upper Canada's Privy Council.

In 1831 Small inherited extensive property from his father. This property included a 1 acre (0.40 hectares) parcel between Front and King, and Ontario and what is now Berkeley, but was then known as Parliament Street, on the original townsite of York, Upper Canada (later Toronto), with a large house, called Berkeley House. (Note: The Ontario Genealogical Society reports John Small left this York property, jointly, to Charles Coxwell Small, and his older brother James Edward Small.) Charles Coxwell Small added to the house, transforming it into what Beaches Living called a "mansion". When new Parliament buildings were built, elsewhere, the original Parliament Street was renamed Berkeley after the Small grand home.

He also inherited a 472 acres (191 hectares) parcel bounded by what is now Queen, Coxwell, Danforth, and Kingston Road, then outside of the city limits.

Coxwell Avenue is named after Charles Coxwell Small. Small dammed the creek on his rural property, to harness the waterpower for a sawmill. The large pond this created was named Small's Pond. The largest of the creeks he dammed was renamed Small's Creek.

Charles Coxwell Small had a son born in 1831, the year his father died, who he also named John Small, served in Parliaments of the Province of Canada and Canada. His son was elected to Parliament of the Province of Canada for the riding of East Toronto Riding in 1855 and was later elected to the Parliament of Canada.
