= George Playter =

The Reverend George Playter
- Born: George Frederick Playter; 31 August 1809; London, England
- Died: 24 October 1866 (aged 57); Frankford, Canada West
- Religion: Christianity (Methodist)
- Ordained: 1838
- Writings: The History of Methodism in Canada (1862)

George Frederick Playter (31 August 1809 – 24 October 1866) was a Canadian minister, historian, and author who wrote The History of Methodism in Canada: With an Account of the Rise and Progress of the Work of God Among the Canadian Indian Tribes; and Occasional Notices of the Civil Affairs of the Province. It was published in Toronto by Anson Green, 1862.

Born in England in 1809, in 1832 Playter immigrated to Montreal, where he was hired as a printer. He was a minister of the Wesleyan Methodist Church in Toronto and elsewhere throughout Eastern Ontario. His frequently cited book, The History of Methodism in Canada, was published as volume 1. Playter died before volume 2 could be published.

From 1844 to 1846, Playter was editor of The Christian Guardian, the predecessor of today's United Church Observer, one of the oldest and most respected church publications in Canada.
