= Small's Pond =

Coordinates: 43.66741°N 79.31294°W

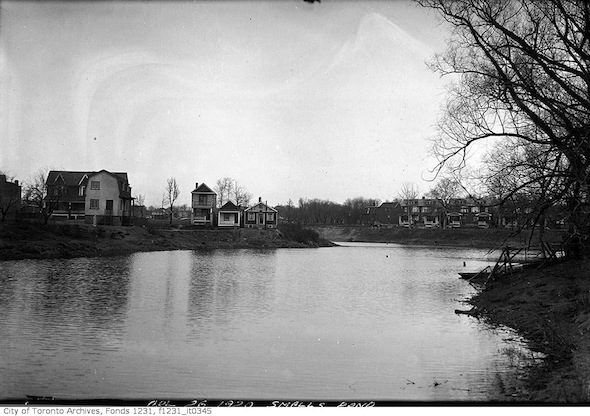
Houses overlooking Small's Pond.

Small's Pond was a pond located near Queen Street East and Kingston Road in Toronto, Canada. Some accounts say it was twelve feet deep, others that it was twelve meters deep. While some accounts say it was a natural feature, Jane Fairburn, in "Along the Shore: Rediscovering Toronto's Waterfront Heritage", wrote that gentleman farmer Charles Coxwell Small, owner of 472 acres (191 hectares), dammed a creek then called Serpentine Creek, to form the dam, for the water-power for sawmills.

== History ==
In late-19th-century winters its ice was harvested and stored, in slabs, as its waters remained clean, when the nearby Don River had become polluted. Stored slabs of ice were used to keep food cool before artificial refrigeration had been invented.

The farmland surrounding the lake, and the small creeks that fed it, were annexed into the growing city of Toronto around the turn of the 20th century. By 1909 those creeks had become polluted, and were buried and converted into sewers.

In 1919, a 9-year-old boy drowned in the pond.

In 1935, after the creeks that fed it had been diverted, the pond had become stagnant, and was drained and filled in.
