= Mary Cameron =

Mary Cameron may refer to:

- Mary Cameron (painter) (1865–1921), Scottish portrait painter
- Mary Gilmore (1865–1962), née Mary Cameron, Australian socialist poet and journalist
- Mary Cameron (mother of David Cameron) (1934–2025), mother of former Prime Minister of the United Kingdom
- Mary Cameron (entomologist), British professor of medical entomology
- Mary Lovett Cameron (1848–1930), British artist and writer of fiction and travel books
