= Flora Macaulay =

Flora Macaulay

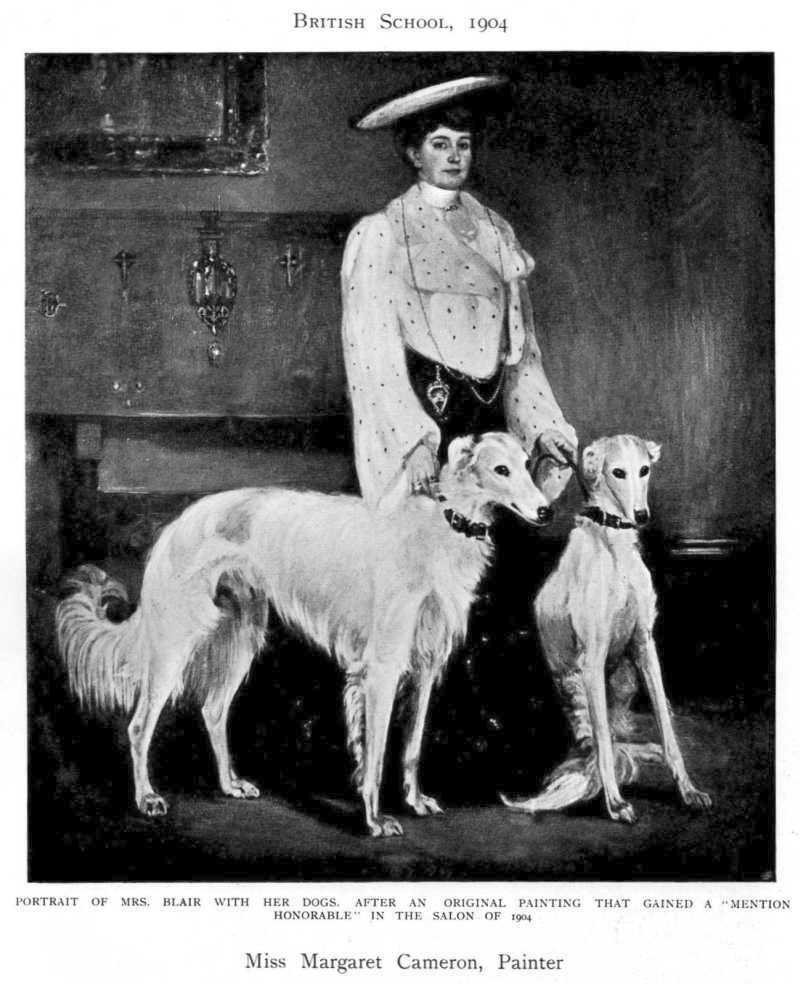
Mrs. Blair with her Dogs, painted by her sister, Mary Cameron

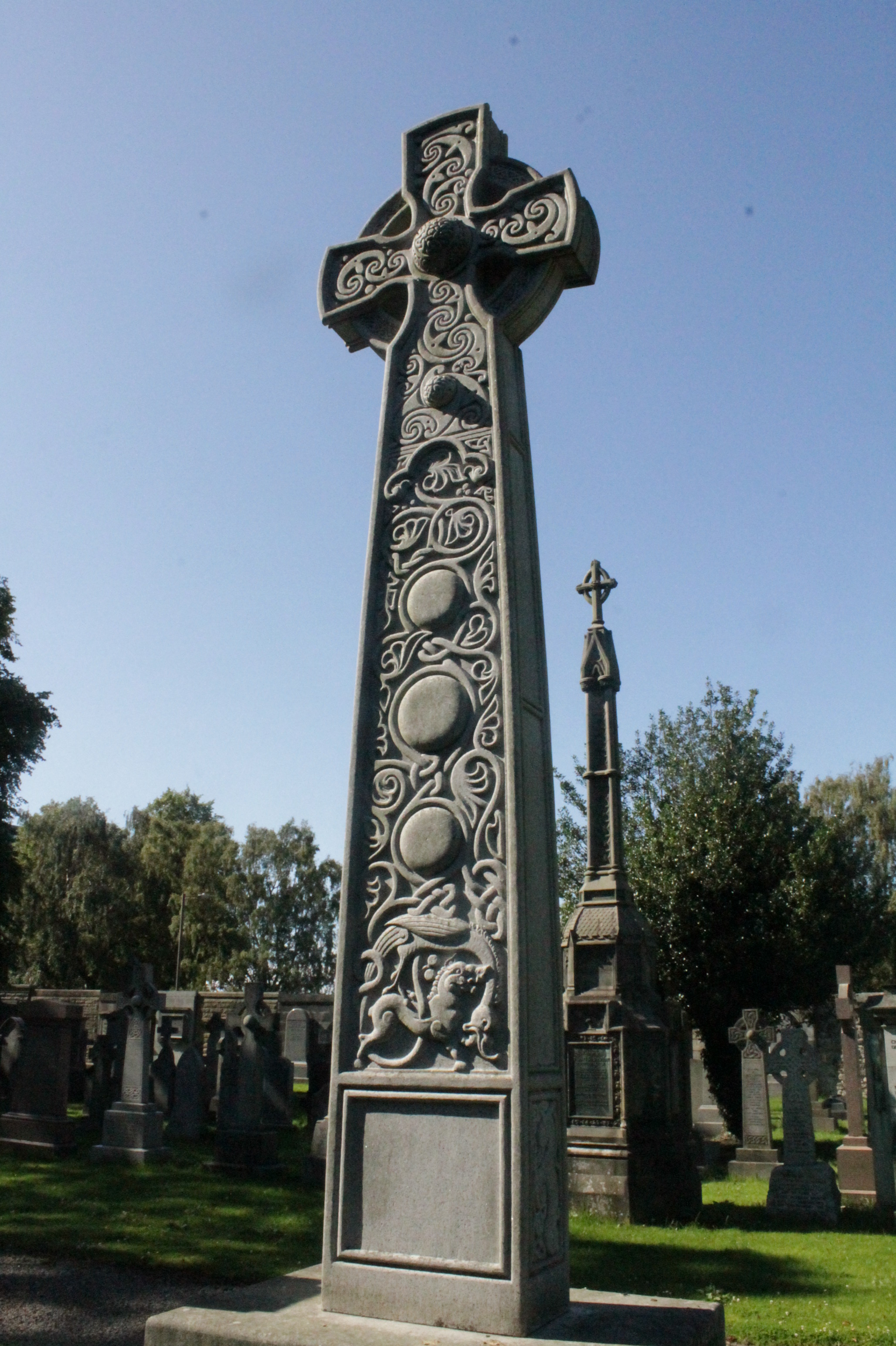
Flora's grave in Dean Cemetery

Flora Macaulay (1859 - 1958) was a Scottish newspaper editor. She was editor of The Oban Times in Oban, Scotland.

== Life ==
She was born Flora Anne Cameron, at 7 Lutton Place in Edinburgh.

Her father was Duncan Cameron, who was associated with the printing and stationery firm of Macniven and Cameron of Edinburgh, Scotland and the inventor of the "Waverley" pen nib. Her mother was Mary Brown Small, a descendant of the Smalls of Dirnanean. Flora's younger sister was Scottish painter Mary Cameron. Her father bought the Oban Times in 1882 and placed Flora's eldest brother as editor.

Flora firstly married Robert Blair, a minister, on 29 October 1889. They originally lived in Glasgow but they relocated to Edinburgh when Blair got a position as minister of St John's Church. They then lived at 13 Lynedoch Place near Dean Bridge.

In 1911, after the death of her first husband, Flora married Edinburgh policeman, George Macaulay.

After her husband's retirement, the couple moved to Oban, where under the name Flora Macauley, she replaced her brother as editor of the Cameron family owned The Oban Times newspaper. Flora and her husband lived on the second floor of the Oban Times building, allowing Flora to be involved in every aspect of the paper's production. Her editorial style was very pro-Gaelic, including supporting Highland bagpipers and the ancient Scottish sport of shinty. In 1947 Flora established the Macaulay Cup for shinty. Flora remained involved with the management of the newspaper until her death at age 99.

She died in Oban on 31 January 1958 but was buried with her first husband, Rev Blair, in Dean Cemetery in west Edinburgh. The grave is marked by a highly ornate Celtic cross carved in grey granite by Stewart McGlashan. The grave lies on the central path in the first north extension.

Her nephew, Alan Cameron, eventually succeeded her as editor.
