= Mary Cameron (painter) =

Scottish artist (1865–1921)

Mary Margaret Cameron
- Mary Cameron in her studio
- Born: 3 March 1865; Portobello, Midlothian, Scotland
- Died: 21 February 1921 (aged 55); Turnhouse, Scotland
- Education: Trustees Drawing Academy
- Notable work: Portrait de Mme. Blair et ses borzois
- Spouse: Alexis Millar

Mary Margaret Cameron (9 March 1865 – 15 February 1921) was a Scottish artist, known for her depictions of everyday Spanish life. She exhibited 54 works at the Royal Scottish Academy between 1886 and 1919.

== Early life and education ==
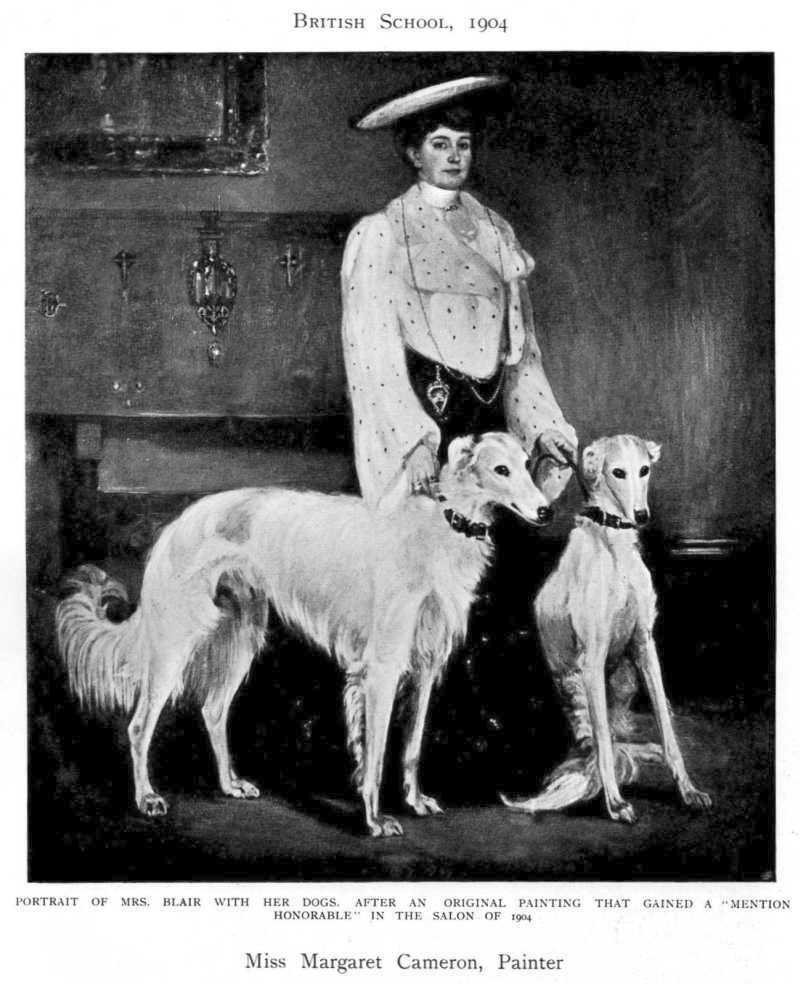
Mrs. Blair with her Dogs

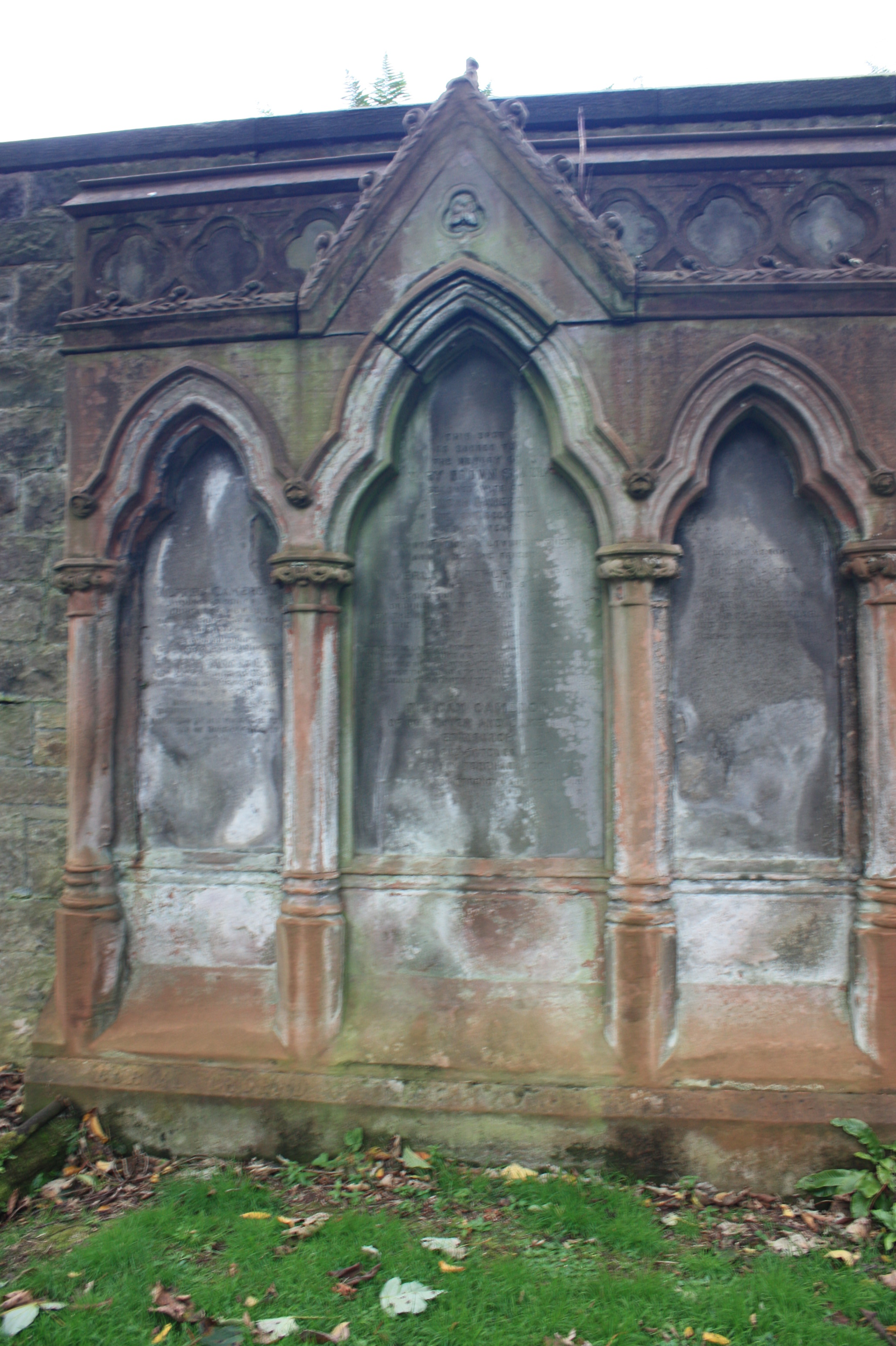
The grave of the Cameron family, Dean Cemetery

Mary Margaret Cameron was born on 9 March 1865 in Portobello in Edinburgh, the third of six children of Mary Brown Small and Duncan Cameron. Her father was associated with the Edinburgh printing and stationery firm of Macniven and Cameron and the inventor of the "Waverley" pen-nib. Her father also owned The Oban Times newspaper. Her mother was a member of the Smalls of Dirnanean of Perthshire. Cameron was the younger sister of Flora Macaulay – widow of the Rev Robert Blair – who was editor of The Oban Times newspaper until her death in 1958, aged 99.

Cameron first began her art education at 16 through the Trustees Drawing Academy of Edinburgh and began to win prizes from the age of 17. She took classes at the Edinburgh Veterinary College to perfect her understanding of animal anatomy, and developed a particular skill for depicting horses. This reflected her early interest in unusual subject matter, and was helped by her ability to use her own horse as a model.

== Spain ==
In 1900, Cameron travelled to Madrid in Spain to study the work of 17th-century Spanish painter, Diego Velázquez. She fell in love with the country, its people and culture. She painted many Spanish scenes, violent and masculine topics such as battlefields, horse racing and particularly bullfights, and lived for a time in Madrid and Seville. She generated controversy in her native Scotland over her realistic portrayal of the sometimes brutal bullfighting scenes.

== Career ==
Cameron was a founding member of the Edinburgh Ladies Art Club and the first exhibition of the Society of Scottish Artists, she was later involved with the Royal Scottish Academy, (RSA) but in 1901, when women could exhibit at RSA but not become members, her application was nominated with Pheobe Anna Traquair and Christina Paterson Ross, but no women were elected until Josephine Haswell Miller in 1938. Cameron had three other failed attempts. She exhibited 56 works at the RSA between 1886 and 1919. Her painting, Portrait de Mme. Blair et ses borzois received a "Mention Honorable" at the Paris Salon in 1904. The winning portrait depicted her sister Flora with her two Russian Borzoi dogs at either side. The painting, along with one of Cameron's Spanish paintings, was published in the book Women Painters of the World (1905).

Cameron held four solo exhibitions between 1908 and 1913 in Edinburgh, London and Paris, with a critic praising her "power, ease and fearlessness".

Cameron was also a capable linguist and spoke French and Spanish fluently. She was fluent in German and Italian, and knew enough Russian to read and translate it.

On 30 June 1905 Cameron married Alexis Millar, a horse dealer and jobmaster from Edinburgh, at St Martin-in-the-Fields in London. Mary Cameron died at Turnhouse, a hamlet to the west of the Edinburgh, on 15 February 1921, and is buried in Dean Cemetery in Edinburgh. The grave lies in the obscured southern terrace, towards the east end.

== Legacy ==
Cameron has a small number of paintings in the British national collections. A portrait of Cameron at work in her studio, by John Brown Abercromby, is held by the National Gallery of Scotland. She has been described as a 'trailblazer" for women artists and gender equality.
