= Mary L. Pendered =

English novelist (1858–1940)

Mary Lucy Pendered (1858 – 19 December 1940) was an English novelist with a career spanning over fifty years. Despite attaining some popularity in her day, she has subsequently fallen into obscurity.

== Biography ==
Born in Peckham, Mary Lucy Pendered was the daughter of Thomas Pendered, an auctioneer, and Elizabeth (née Hill). She spent much of her life living in Wellingborough, Northamptonshire.

In 1892 she moved to London to become a journalist working for Life magazine and later the London edition of the Detroit Free Press. After this she spent three or four months in Scotland reporting for the Oban Times. It was here that she worked with Alice Stronach writing four or five columns a night. In addition, she contributed many short stories to periodicals, writing several pieces for the British Musician and Musical News and the Musical Times. She also wrote letters to the newspapers on topics such as women’s suffrage and pacifism.

During the early years of the First World War, Mary lived at Herne Bay, where she was President of the Herne Bay Society for Women’s Suffrage. She was an accomplished pianist and ran a social club for soldiers, offering tea, biscuits, bagatelle and billiards.

On her return to Northamptonshire in 1917, she was elected President of the Wellingborough Branch of the National Union of Women’s Suffrage Societies.

In the 1920s she was an influence on H.E. Bates who was working as a journalist on the Kettering Reminder.

Mary Lucy Pendered died on 19 December 1940 at Beechwood, Overstone Park after a short illness. She was cremated and her ashes were scattered at Kettering.

== Work ==
Pendered has been described as a writer of ‘coy pastoral tales’. She produced 29 novels and plays.

== Bibliography ==
Novels

- Dust and Laurels: a study in nineteenth century womenhood (1894)
- A Pastoral Played Out (1895)
- To Lunaland with a Moon Goblin (1897)
- An Englishman (1899)
- Musk of Roses (1903)
- The Truth about Man by a Spinster (1905)
- A Little Garland (1908)
- The Fair Quaker, Hannah Lightfoot and her relations with George III (1910)
- The Secret of the Dragon (1911)
- Daisy the Minx (1911)
- At Lavender Cottage (1912)
- Phyllida Flouts Me (1913)
- Lily Magic (1913)
- Plain Jill (1915)
- The Secret Sympathy (1916)
- The Book of Common Joys (1916)
- William Penn: A Play (1922)
- Land of Moonshine (1922)
- John Martin, Painter (1923)
- The Quaker (1926)
- Mortmain (1928)
- Amber Rose (1928)
- The Uncanny House (1929)
- A Heart Call (1929)
- The Forsaken House at Misty Vale (1932)
- A Pageant at Northamptonshire (1933)
- Herriot of Wellinborrow (1936)
- Princess or Pretender (1939)

Short stories

- ‘Chobertstein’ The Magazine of Music (1886)
- ‘That haunting minor strain’ The Magazine of Music (1886)
- ‘I love thee so’ The Magazine of Music (1886)
- ‘Music hath charms’ The Magazine of Music (1886)
- ‘My lady is so sweet’ The Magazine of Music (1887)
- ‘Amateur singing’ The Magazine of Music (1887)
- ‘A baneful banjo!’ The Magazine of Music (1888)
- ‘A little bird told me’ The Magazine of Music (1888)
- ‘When kissing's in fashion’ The Magazine of Music (1888)
- ‘His model’ Belgravia (1889)
- ‘Attraction!’ The Girls' Own Paper (November 1889)
- ‘Artistic Affinities’ Musical Standard (1892)
- ‘A Swerve aside’ Quiver (1893)
- ‘Cynthia's Success’ Myra's Journal of Dress and Fashion (January 1893)
- ‘Miss Miffin's crime’ The Idler (1895)
- ‘The kidnapping of the "squaller’ The Idler (1895)
- ‘Dr. O. W. Holmes on the "New Woman’ Women's Penny Paper (July 1895)
- ‘Drawing-room songs’ The Magazine of Music (1896)
- ‘An old irish history’ The New Century Review (1897)
- ‘Ben Plumby's cornet’ Longman's Magazine (1897)
- ‘The 'orse’ Longman's Magazine (1897)
- ‘The sport of devils’ The Idler (1898)
- ‘Thin-skun’ The Idler (1898)
- ‘A Surprise at the Hydro’ The Idler (1898)
- ‘The simplicity of Susan’ Belgravia (1899)
- 'On the art of accompanying’ Cassell’s Family Magazine (July 1890)
- ‘Mathilde Blind’ The Academy (1900)
- ‘How Morag found her Lad’ Temple Bar (1901)
- ‘The Gooseberry and the Goblin’ The Argosy (1901)
- ‘Adam's aunt’ Temple Bar (1904)
- ‘The Match Breaker’ The Smart Set (1904)
- ‘Mademoiselle Gaurier’ Quiver (Jan 1906)
- ‘Irene’s Horrible Presentiment’ Temple Bar (July 1906)
- ‘Torch Lily’ Royal Magazine(1908)
- ‘Sympathy [Poem]’ The Girls' Own Paper n.d.
