= Robert Blair (minister) =

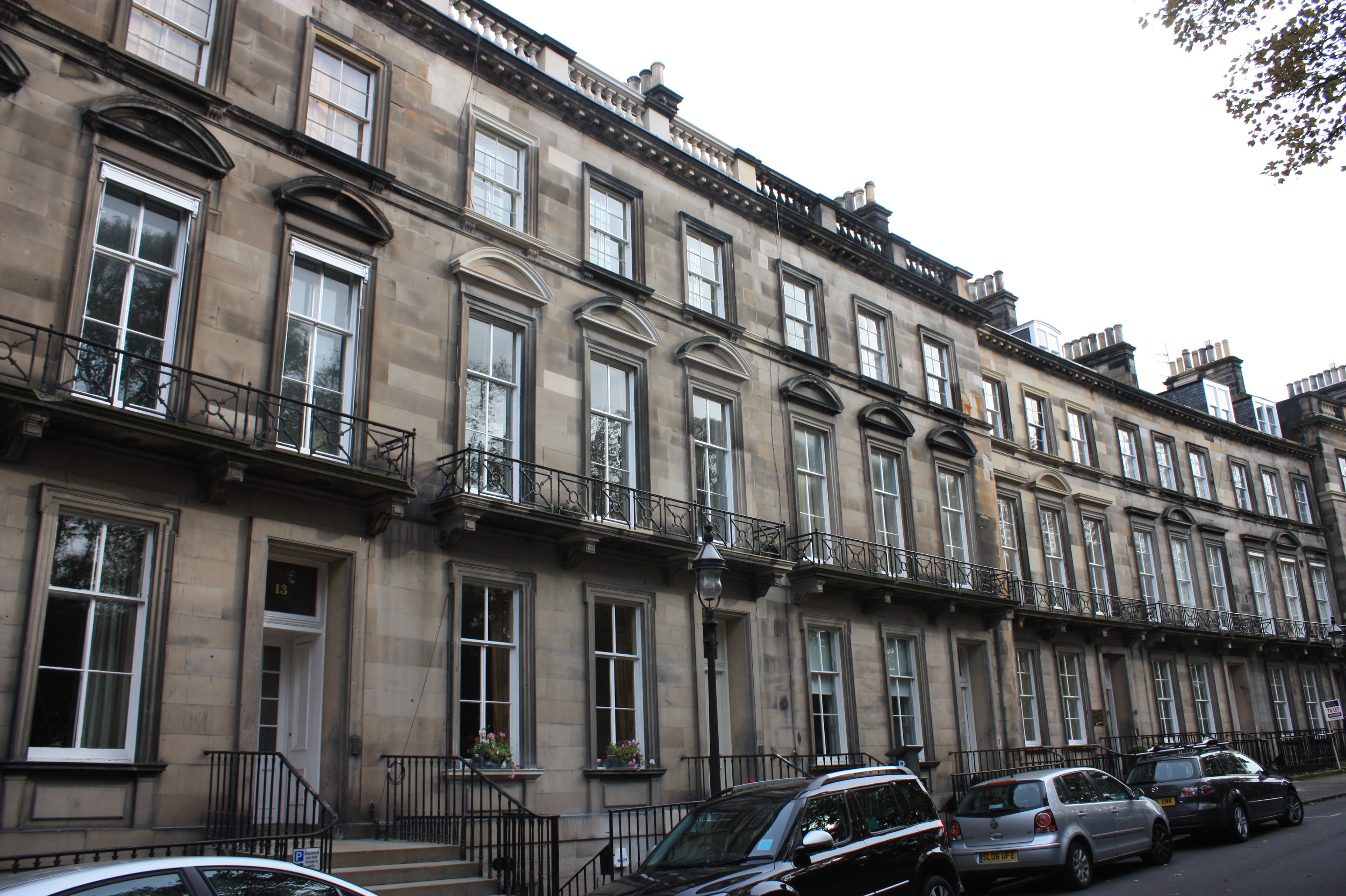
Blair's house, 12 Clarendon Crescent, Edinburgh

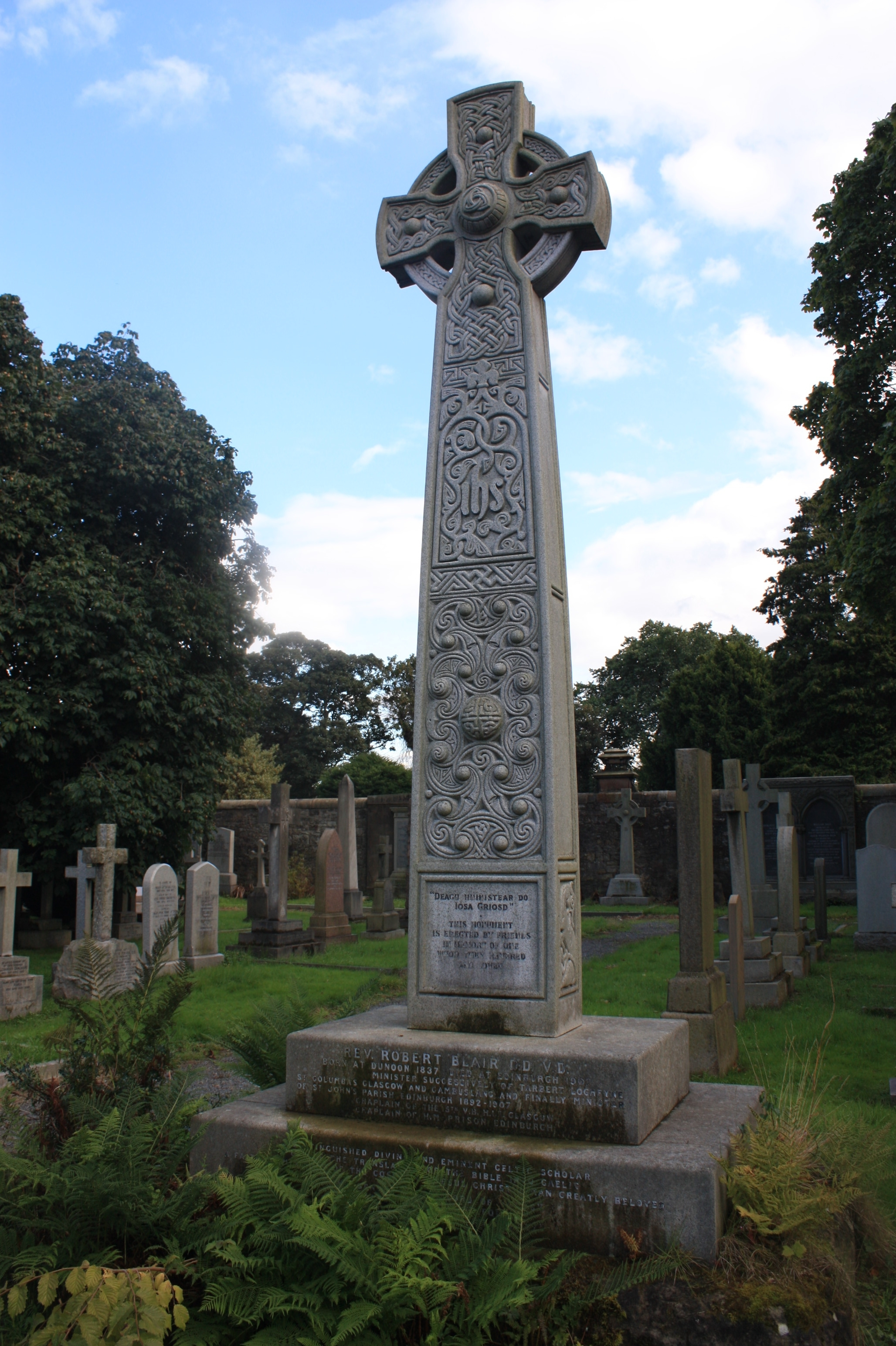
Rev Robert Blair's grave, Dean Cemetery

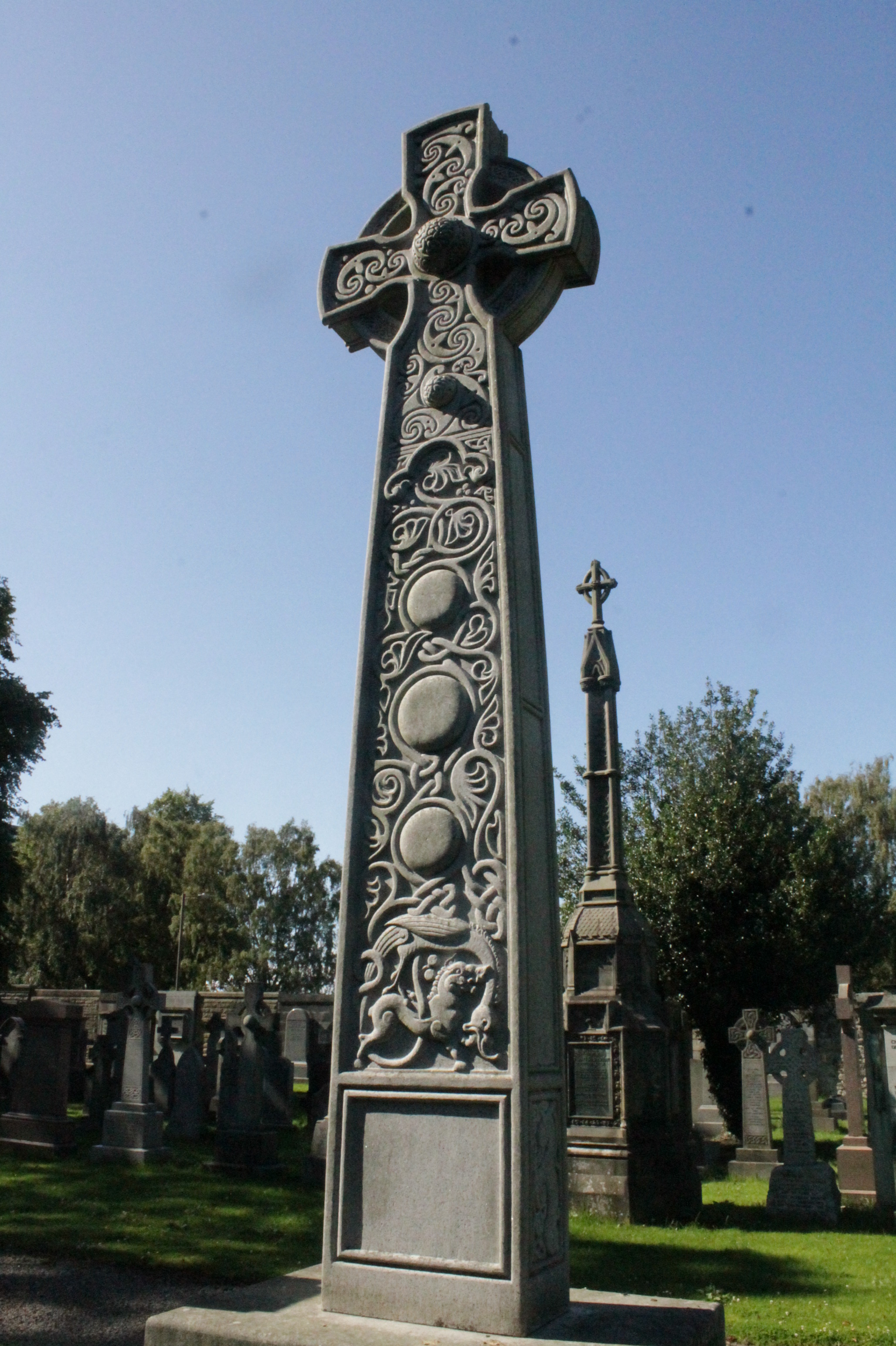
The ornate south side of the grave in Dean Cemetery

Robert Blair (3 May 1837 – 4 November 1907) was a Scottish minister and a Gaelic scholar.

== Personal life ==
Blair was born in Bullwood, Dunoon, Scotland, the son of Duncan Blair and Margaret Campbell. He was educated at Bowmore School, Islay, then Glasgow University where he gained an M.A. in 1863.

He was licensed by the Presbytery of Kintyre on 29 November 1865 when he was assistant at Saddell. He was ordained to Tarbert, Loch Fyne on 19 September 1867.

On 6 May 1869 he moved to St Columba's Church, Glasgow, a Gaelic Church. He then went to Cambuslang on 23 May 1882, where he succeeded the Rev. Dr. James S. Johnstone. Blair was followed at Cambuslang by the Rev. James Edward Houston (1892-1908). Blair moved to St John's parish church, Edinburgh on 20 July 1892. He was awarded a Doctorate of Divinity by Glasgow University in 1891. He served as chaplain to the Glasgow Highlanders and to H.M. Prison, Edinburgh, and was awarded the Volunteer Officers' Decoration (VD) on 15 August 1902.

Blair married Flora Anne Cameron, daughter of Duncan Cameron, inventor of the "Waverley" pen nib, on 29 October 1889. Flora's mother - Mary Brown Small - and her family were members of the Smalls of Dirnanean in Perthshire, Scotland.

In 1905 he is listed as living at 12 Clarendon Crescent, close to Dean Bridge in Edinburgh.

Blair died on 4 November 1907 in Edinburgh and was buried near his home, in Dean Cemetery. His grave is marked by a huge (6m) pale granite Celtic cross by Stewart McGlashan, facing the central path of the north section of the main cemetery.

His wife remarried and died in Oban but chose to be buried with Robert when she died.

== Memorials ==
A baptismal font honoring Blair was installed by the parishioners in the church at Cambuslang in 1908. Blair was also memorialized by a bust in St. Columba's Church, Glasgow and a window in Iona Abbey.

== Scholarly contributions ==
Blair edited the Gaelic poems (with Memoir) of William Livingstone, (1808-1870), the Islay Bard (Glasgow, 1882). He also translated a number of hymns into Gaelic, and wrote Gaelic articles for The Gael, (Glasgow, 1873–1876).

Blair was one of the translators of the Revised Version of the Bible into Gaelic.
