= Duncan Cameron (Scottish inventor) =

Scottish businessman (1825–1901)

Duncan Cameron, portrait painted by his daughter, Mary Cameron

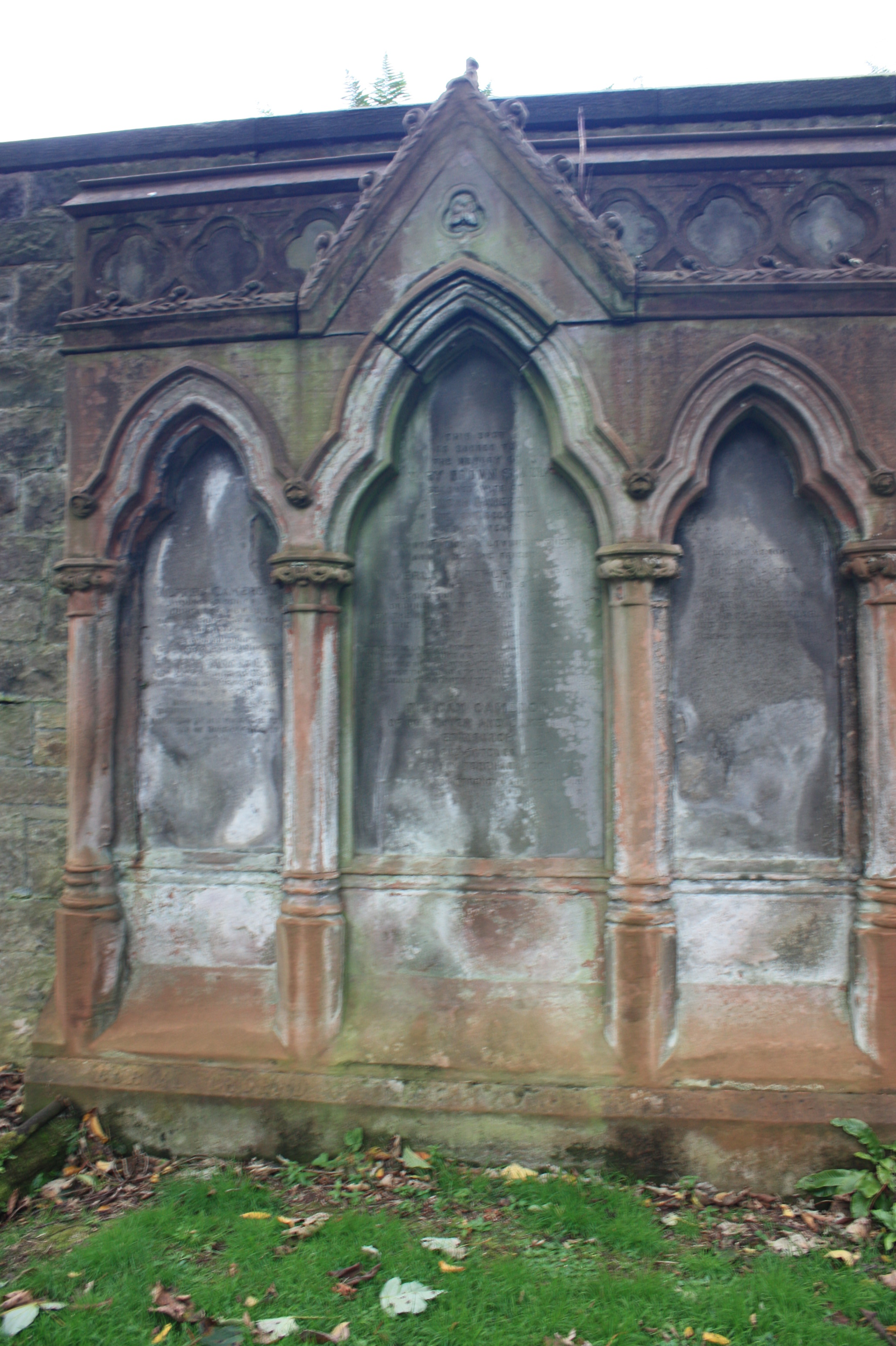
The grave of Duncan Cameron, Dean Cemetery

Duncan Cameron (12 October 1825 – 19 February 1901) was a Scottish businessman, owner of The Oban Times newspaper and the inventor of the "Waverley" pen-nib.

== Life ==
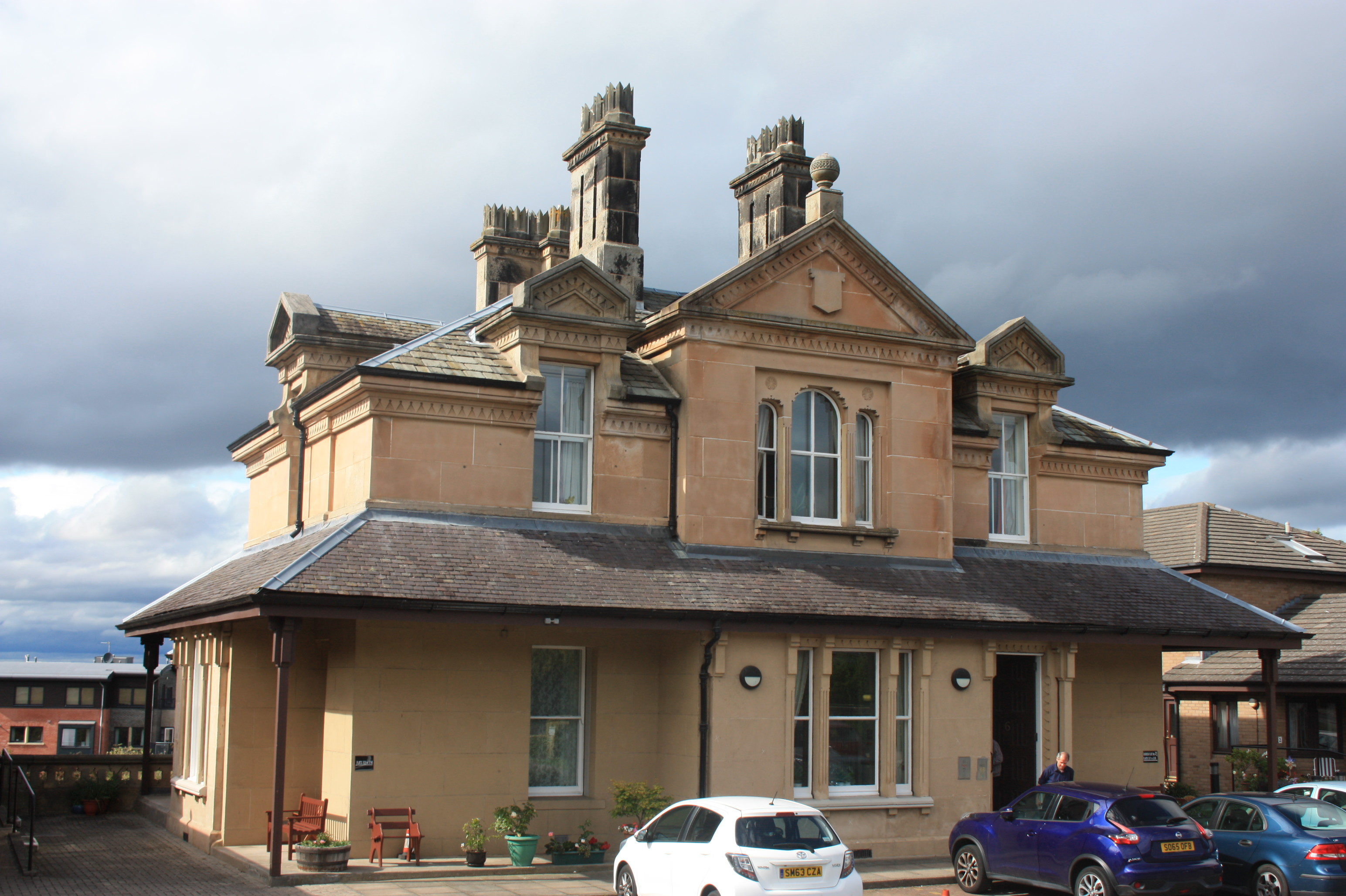
Waverley House on Colinton Road

Duncan Cameron, along with his brothers John and Donald Cameron, were the owners of the Edinburgh-based printing and stationery firm of Macniven and Cameron. Duncan Cameron joined the firm in 1850, and in 1865 received a patent for the "Waverley" nib for the company. The popular "Waverley" was unique in design with a narrow waist and an upturned tip. The tip's design made the ink flow more smoothly on the paper. The "Waverley" was named after the Waverley novels of Sir Walter Scott (1771–1832), which were still hugely popular at the time.

In 1882, Cameron purchased The Oban Times newspaper for £4,000 following the death of its founder, James Miller. Cameron appointed his twenty-one-year-old son, also named Duncan Cameron, as the editor. The senior Cameron's oldest daughter, Flora Macaulay, became the paper's editor when her brother Duncan left for Edinburgh to join the family's stationery business and another brother, Waverley, drowned at Lismore. Flora stayed involved with The Oban Times until her death at 99 in 1958. She was succeeded as editor by her nephew, Alan Cameron.

In 1884 he commissioned the Edinburgh architect, Sir James Gowans to create a villa named "Waverley", formerly 82 Colinton Road, but converted to retirement flats in the 1990s and now named Perdrixknowe. The house contains numerous odd details, such as the stair banisters being in the form of pens and the chimney pots being based on pen-nibs.

Duncan Cameron died at Waverley on 19 February 1901 in Edinburgh, Scotland and is buried in the family plot in Dean Cemetery in Edinburgh, which lies on the obscured lower southern terrace, towards the east end.

== Personal life ==
Duncan Cameron married Mary Brown Small on 25 June 1858 in Haddington, East Lothian, Scotland. Cameron's wife was a member of the Smalls of Dirnanean.

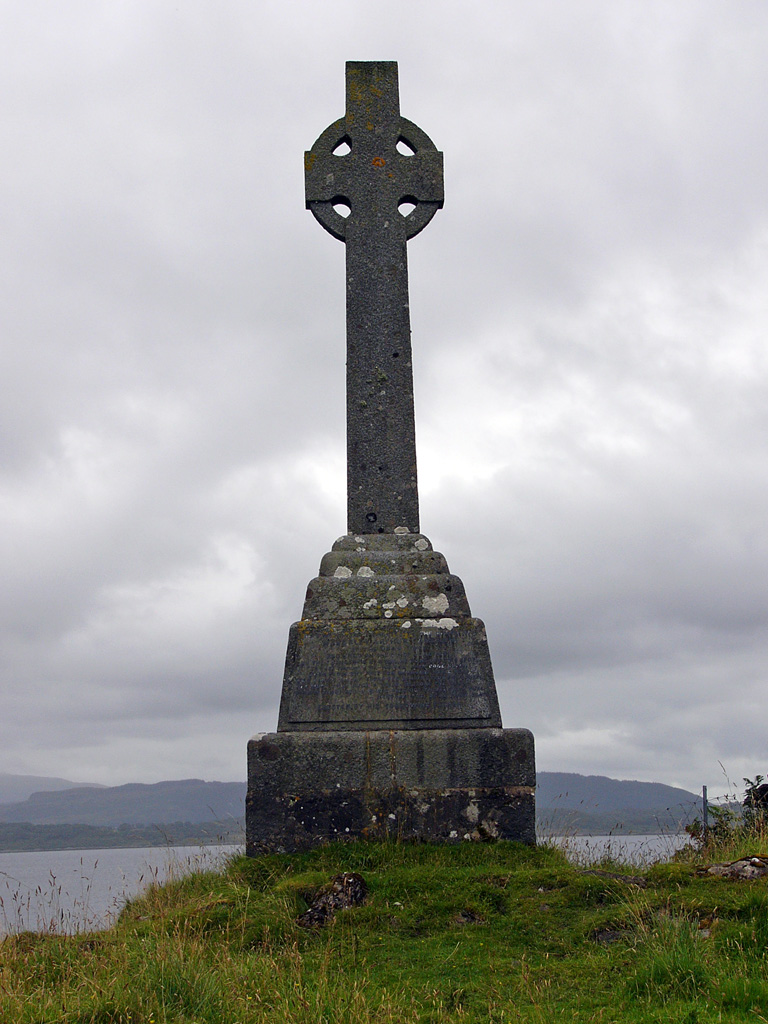
Celtic cross memorial to Waverley Arthur Cameron on Lismore

A younger daughter, Mary Cameron, was a Scottish portrait artist of some renown.

On the death of his son Waverley, Cameron erected a memorial in his name on Lismore. The inscription at the base of the cross reads:

This Monument Is Erected to the Memory Of
Waverley Arthur Cameron
Of The Oban Times
Drowned on the 4th of June 1891
By The Foundering of a Sailing Boat Off This Spot
"To Thee The Love of Woman Hath Gone Down:
Dark Flow Thy Tides O'er Manhood's Noble Head.
O'er Youth's Bright Locks And Beauty's Flowery Crown.
Yet Must Thou Hear A Voice: Restore The Dead:-
Earth Shall Reclaim Her Precious Things From Thee
Restore, Restore The Dead, Thou Sea"
Erected By His Sorrowing Father

Robert Blair, a Scottish minister at Cambuslang, Scotland, was Cameron's son-in-law.
