= The Arran Banner =

- Type: Weekly newspaper
- Format: Tabloid
- Owner: Oban Times Group
- Publisher: The Oban Times
- Founded: 1974
- Headquarters: Arran Banner; Brodick; Isle of Arran; KA27 8AJ
- Country: Scotland
- Circulation: 2,006 (as of 2023)
- Website: arranbanner.co.uk

The Arran Banner is a weekly local newspaper on the Isle of Arran in Scotland. It was established in 1974 and is published on a Friday. The paper attracts subscribers from around the world for its often unique and witty writing style. The newspaper is renowned for often controversial and heated discussion in its letters pages. Recently this has included debates on climate change, the state of Arran's roads and recurring issues with the ferry service to the island.

== Circulation ==
The newspaper is also famous for a very high readership among the local population. In 1984 it received a Guinness World Record recognising this fact. The entry reads: "The Arran Banner, founded in 1974, has a readership of more than 97 per cent in Britain’s seventh largest off-shore island". Recently, for the year 2024, The Banner was named as the top one of only three newspapers in Scotland with a rise in circulation. In 2015, it had a circulation of just over 3,000 copies each week.

== Sale to the Oban Times group ==
For many years it was under the ownership and editorship of John Millar. In 2003, the Arran Banner was purchased by the Oban Times Group, who continue to publish the newspaper today. Soon after its sale, the newspaper converted to a tabloid, colour format, from the previous A4 format. It is also now printed off the island, being printed on Thursday afternoons before arriving on the island each Friday morning. Former editor John Millar continued to write weekly Banner leader columns until 2008.

The newspaper is written by Colin Smeeton who joined the team in July 2015. Colin Smeeton is the only reporter working at the paper after news editor Hugh Boag retired in January 2024 after 47 in the industry.

The retail price of the newspaper increased to £1 on Friday 4 February 2022 (edition 2270) after being at 85p for the previous three years. Since 16 December 2022 the retail price has increased to £1.10.

As well as continuing to produce the weekly edition of the newspaper the company are also responsible for a popular hand-drawn tourist map of the island and the annual Holiday Arran magazine.

The Arran Banner also has a website where some news is displayed for free but there is also a paid for section (Paywall).

In January 2024 all four websites belonging to Wyvex Media Ltd (The Arran Banner, Oban Times, Campbeltown Courier and Argyllshire Advertiser) were combined into one site called West Coast Today allowing paid for subscribers to have one subscription to access all the news content (website and digital e-editions) produced on the West Coast of Scotland .
