= Edinburgh Ladies Art Club =

Art club in Edinburgh

- Formation: 1888
- Type: Arts, Literature & Science

The Edinburgh Ladies Art Club, or sometimes the Edinburgh Professional Ladies Art Club., was founded in 1888. The club was formed for 'mutual encouragement and assistance in art study'.

== History ==
There was a lack of support for women artists in Edinburgh. Whereas the Glasgow Society of Lady Artists had close links with the Glasgow School of Art, in Edinburgh the Edinburgh College of Art was still to founded; the precursor of that the 'Edinburgh School of Art was a poorly organised collection of classes under the supervision of the RSA. Both J.D. Fergusson and S. J. Peploe [...] gave up fairly quickly on the Edinburgh classes in the 1890s.

The Royal Scottish Academy in the nineteenth century offered little support to women. 'The Scotsman in October 1889 commented that the RSA had not yet seen fit to offer tuition in art to lady students, so that when female students completed their work at the Board of Manufactures School they had to continue their art education in a somewhat desultory way or set up their own life-drawing classes. Consequently, from the start the Edinburgh Ladies Art Club was from the start an oppositional group since there was a distinct lack of support in contrast with the Glasgow Society of Lady Artists.

== Formation of the Ladies Art Club ==
Mary Cameron and her Edinburgh contemporaries formed the Edinburgh Ladies' Art Club in 1888.

The Edinburgh Evening News - Monday 28 October 1889 dates the Edinburgh Ladies Art Club to the previous year (1888):

EDINBURGH LADIES ART CLUB. The first exhibition held in connection with the Edinburgh Professional Ladies' Art Club to-day in the galleries of Messrs Doig and McKechnie, George Street. The club was founded about a year ago, and the primary object of the Exhibition that by placing their work alongside each other the artists may be able to detect wherein their weakness lies, and a spirit of emulation be encouraged. There are 28 members in the club and each is represented by several pictures. These embrace works in oil water colours, and etchings. The pictures are neatly arranged, and make a very good and interesting exhibition. Some the works display considerable merit, and include landscapes, portraits, and still life.

== Membership ==
At first the membership was limited to 30 members, but that limit was gradually lifted. In 1890 there were 29 members with one vacancy.

In 1892, the club had 33 members, and Christina Paterson Ross was the President.

== Members ==
- Mary Cameron

== See also ==
- Glasgow Society of Lady Artists
