= Mary Cameron (entomologist) =

British medical entomologist and researcher

Mary Cameron FRES
- Education: Bedford College, University of London (BSc); University of London (PhD)
- Scientific career
- Workplaces: University of Oxford Liverpool School of Tropical Medicine London School of Hygiene and Tropical Medicine

Mary M. Cameron FRES is a medical entomologist in the United Kingdom. In 2019 she was the Professor of Medical Entomology at the London School of Hygiene and Tropical Medicine.

== Education and career ==
Cameron obtained a BSc in Zoology in 1983 from Bedford College (now Royal Holloway, University of London) and then a PhD in Entomology in 1987 from the University of London.

She was a postdoctoral researcher at the University of Oxford and then a research fellow at the Liverpool School of Tropical Medicine, before moving to the London School of Hygiene and Tropical Medicine in 1995 as a lecturer, where she is now Professor of Medical Entomology.

== Research ==
Cameron carries out field and laboratory research focusing on the surveillance and control of a wide range of vector-borne diseases, particularly leishmaniasis. She works internationally and she is a member of the World Health Organisation's Regional Technical Advisory Group focussing on Kala-azar disease elimination in South-East Asia.

She is editor of the Royal Entomological Society's journal Medical and Veterinary Entomology. In 2013 she co-edited a book Biological and Environmental Control of Disease Vectors published by the Centre for Agriculture and Bioscience International.

Cameron is cofounder and director of Vecotech, a spin-off company of the London School of Hygiene and Tropical Medicine.
