= Mary Lovett Cameron =

British writer

- Born: 1848; Wavertree, Lancashire, U.K.
- Died: April 20, 1930 (aged 81–82); Langport, Somerset, U.K.
- Occupation(s): Writer, artist

Mary Lovett Cameron (1848 – 20 April 1930) was a British artist and writer of fiction and travel books, based in Cornwall.

== Biography ==
Cameron was born in Wavertree, Lancashire, the daughter of Charles Francis Lovett Cameron and Julia Buckley Cameron. Her father was born in Ireland.

Cameron lived in St Ives, Cornwall after 1891, and spent time in Italy. In 1898, she was one of the artists who signed the "Glanville letter", a call for less commercial development along the coast at St Ives. Also in 1898, she was assaulted in her home by a young man; she escaped further harm by locking herself in a pantry, and calling out a window for help. In 1918, she was the first woman elected to the office of librarian of the St. Ives Arts Club. She died on Easter in 1930, in her late seventies, at the Convent of St. Gildas in Langport, Somerset.

== Publications ==
There were other British writers who used the name "Lovett Cameron" in Mary Lovett Cameron's time. The following works credit her with the full name "Mary Lovett Cameron". Her short stories were published in newspapers in Great Britain, Australia, New Zealand, and North America.

=== Fiction ===
- Twixt Cup and Lip (1874)
- "Under the Hammer" (1896, serialized)
- "The Bull-Fighter's Secret" (1896)
- "Clare's Last Stake" (1899)
- "Marburg's Secret, or The Three Fountains" (1902)
- "Renunciation" (1902)
- "The Nemesis of a Knife" (1902)
- "An Episode in a Honeymoon" (1903)
- "Count Manfred's Treachery" (1903)
- "Tom Kennedy's Chance" (1904)
- "The Forsaken Hunting Lodge" (1904)
- "The Love Affairs of Odette" (1920)

=== Travel ===
- "Dutch Waterways and Flemish Cities" (1895)
- "In the Bonnie North Countree" (1896)
- Old Etruria and Modern Tuscany (1909)
- Umbria, Past and Present (1913)
- The Inquiring Pilgrim's Guide to Assisi (1926)

=== Scholarship ===
- "The Dragon of La Trinità: an Italian Folk-Tale" (1910)
