= The Oban Times =

- Type: Weekly newspaper
- Owner: Wyvex Media
- Founder: James Miller
- Founded: 1861; 164 years ago
- Language: English
- City: Oban
- Country: Scotland
- Circulation: 5,642 (as of 2023)
- ISSN: 2517-6005
- Website: obantimes.co.uk

The Oban Times is a local, weekly newspaper, published in Oban, Argyll and Bute on a Thursday. It covers the West Highlands and Islands of Scotland, reporting on issues from the Mull of Kintyre to Kyle of Lochalsh on the mainland, to the Inner and Outer Hebridean Islands with Argyll, and Lochaber as its heartlands.

The Lochaber Times is the Lochaber/Fort William/Highlands and surrounding area edition of The Oban Times.

== History ==
In 1861 the Oban Monthly Pictorial Magazine was established by James Miller at a printing site on George Street in Oban. In 1866 the monthly operation became a weekly and changed its name to the Oban Times & Argyllshire Advertiser, although locally it was often referred to as ‘The Highlander’s Bible’. Printing was later transferred to a printing plant at the top of John Street.

In 1882, Duncan Cameron purchased The Oban Times newspaper for £4,000 following the death of James Miller. Cameron was member of the printing and stationery firm of Macniven and Cameron in Edinburgh. Cameron had ancestral connections to the area. After the purchase, Cameron appointed his twenty-one-year-old son, also named Duncan Cameron, as the editor. The senior Cameron's daughter, Flora Macaulay, became the paper's editor when her brother Duncan left for Edinburgh to join the family's stationery business and another brother, Waverley, drowned at Lismore. Flora stayed involved with The Oban Times until her death at 99 in 1958. She was eventually succeeded as editor by her nephew, Alan Cameron.

In June 1976, Alan Cameron decided to relinquish control of the paper, and The Oban Times was acquired by Johnston Press. The control of the paper reverted to private ownership in 1983, when it was purchased by its present owner, Howard Bennett.

From 7 July 1866 until 23 November 1929 (3008 editions), The Oban Times was published as 'The Oban Times and Argyllshire Advertiser' being described as "The County paper of Argyllshire circulating extensively in Glasgow, Edinburgh, Greenock, Paisley, Stirling, Doune, Callander, Tyndrum, Dalmally, Kingussie, Inverness, Fort William, Ballachulish, Tobermory, Easdale, Lochgilphead, Ardrishaig, Inveraray, Portree, Stornoway, the Lewis, Skye, the Western Islands and many other districts". It has since 19th Oct 1929 been published as the 'Oban Times and West Highland Times,' firstly on Saturday and latterly on Thursday, being described as "The regional newspaper for the West Highlands, Islands and Argyll."

In 2016 the Lochaber News was purchased by The Oban Times. The masthead in the northern edition changed to "The Oban Times - Incorporating Lochaber News" - In 2017 the masthead changed again to "The Lochaber Times & Oban Times".

A new website was launched in 2017 introducing a paywall. Whilst some news remained free, a paid-for subscription is required to read the rest. Articles are published behind the paywall over 7 days including up to date news as it happens.

In January 2024 all four websites were combined into one site called West Coast Today allowing paid for subscribers to have one subscription to access all the news content (website and digital e-editions) produced on the West Coast of Scotland.

Cruachan Cam was a webcam which looked over Loch Etive towards Ben Cruachan - Cruachan (The Hollow Mountain) but due to a sale of the property, the webcam was discontinued.

== Today ==
The Oban Times is part of the Wyvex Media Group, which also publishes The Argyllshire Advertiser (est. 1886) covering Mid Argyll and North Kintyre – known locally as "The Squeak," The Arran Banner (est. 1975) covering Arran, The Campbeltown Courier (est. 1873) covering Campbeltown and Kintyre, The Lochaber Times which covers Fort William, Lochaber and the Highlands as well as magazines Scottish Field the monthly Fish Farmer Magazine and associated website as well as a selection of calendars, specials, holiday supplements and local publications including Lochaber Life, West Coast Review, Holiday West Highland.
