= William Beattie-Brown =

Scottish painter

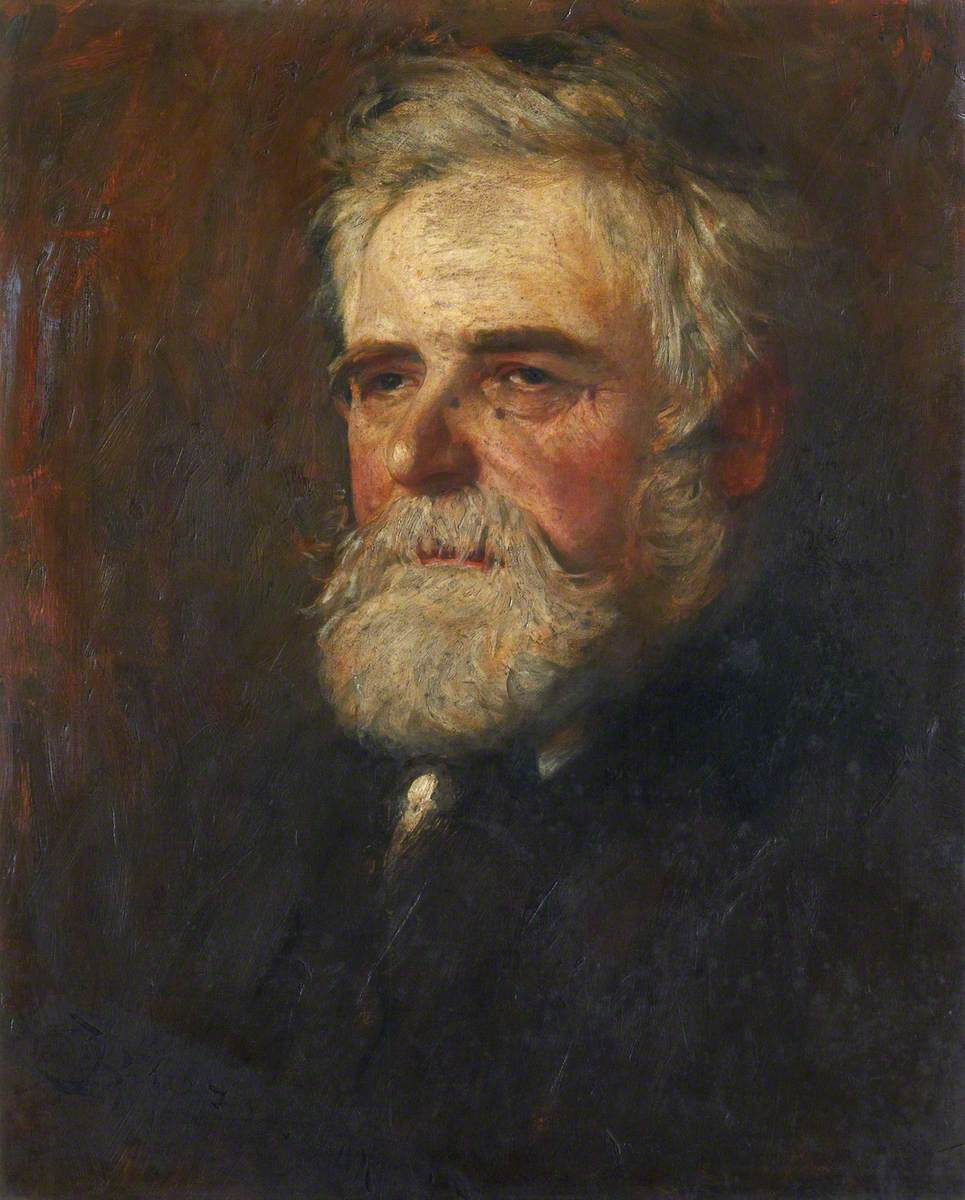
Image of William Beattie Brown

William Beattie-Brown (1831–1909) was a Scottish landscape painter.

== Biography ==
Beattie-Brown was born in the parish of Haddington in 1831, was son of Adam Brown, farmer, and Ann Beattie. He removed at an early age to Edinburgh and was educated at Leith High School. Having early shown a taste for art, he was apprenticed as a glass -stainer to the well-known firm of Messrs. Ballantine, and here his artistic tastes were so rapidly developed that before his apprenticeship was completed he entered the Trustees' Art Academy, then under the charge of Robert Scott Lauder. Among his fellow-students of this period and companions of a later time were William Bell Scott, Horatio MacCulloch, Sam Bough, and George Paul Chalmers. In 1848, when seventeen years of age, he exhibited a picture, ' On the Forth,' at the Royal Scottish Academy, and from that time till his death he was always represented at the annual exhibitions. His skill and accuracy as a draughtsman led to his being employed to make illustrations for several medical works; and his care and discretion as an artist brought him much employment in restoring pictures for Henry Doig, art-dealer, Edinburgh, whose daughter he married in 1858. To extend his experience he studied for a long time in Belgium, there using water-colour as his principal medium, though his chief work was done in oil-colour. He found English subjects for his pictures in Surrey, Kent, and Yorkshire, but his main themes were Scottish highland landscapes. He was a pioneer among the Scottish 'out-of-door' artists, frequently completing his pictures directly from nature a practice which explains his vigour and realism. In 1871 he was elected an associate of the Royal Scottish Academy, and in 1884 an academician. His diploma picture, dated 1883, is a characteristic highland landscape, 'Coire-na-Faireamh,' now in the Scottish National Gallery, Edinburgh. Representative works by him are in the public galleries at Liverpool, Manchester, Oldham, and Bolton. He was a frequent exhibitor at the Royal Academy, London, and also at Glasgow and other Scottish exhibitions. In his later years he adopted a more glowing scheme of colour than in his earlier work; but his pictures were always noticeable for their realistic line and tone, and for their technical excellence. Beattie-Brown died at Edinburgh on 31 March 1909.

By his wife Esther Love Doig, he had three sons and six daughters. The eldest son, H. W. Jennings Brown (1862–1898), showed promise as a portrait and figure-painter.
