= Stewart McGlashan =

Scottish sculptor and mason (1807–1873)

- Born: 2 November 1807; Campbeltown, Scotland, British Empire
- Died: 9 September 1873 (aged 65); Edinburgh, Scotland, British Empire
- Burial place: Warriston Cemetery, Scotland, United Kingdom
- Occupations: sculptor and mason
- Spouse: Mary Buchanan (m. 1833)
- Children: 9
- Parent: James M.

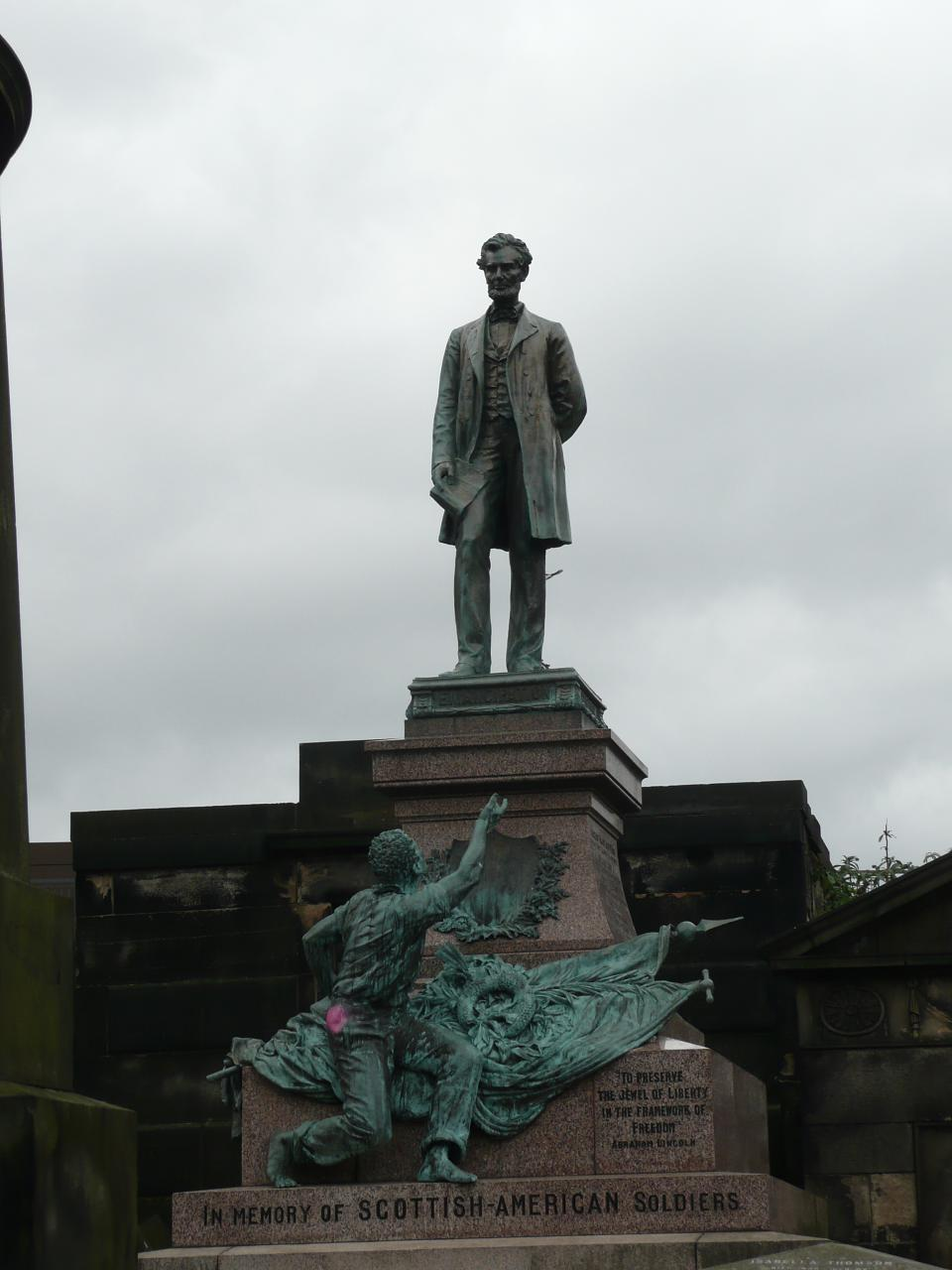
Scottish-American monument in Old Calton Burying Ground

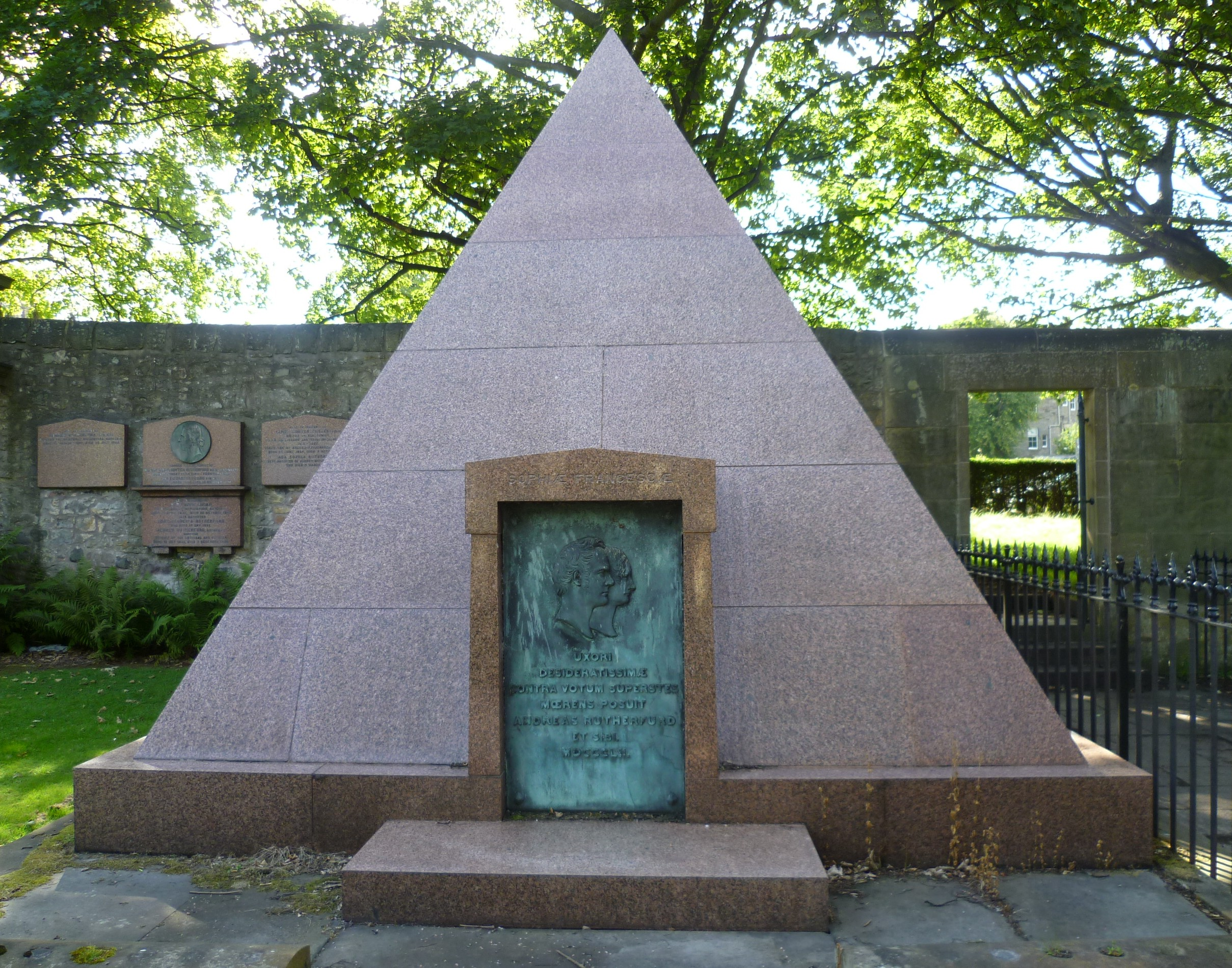
The pyramid to Lord Rutherfurd in the Dean Cemetery

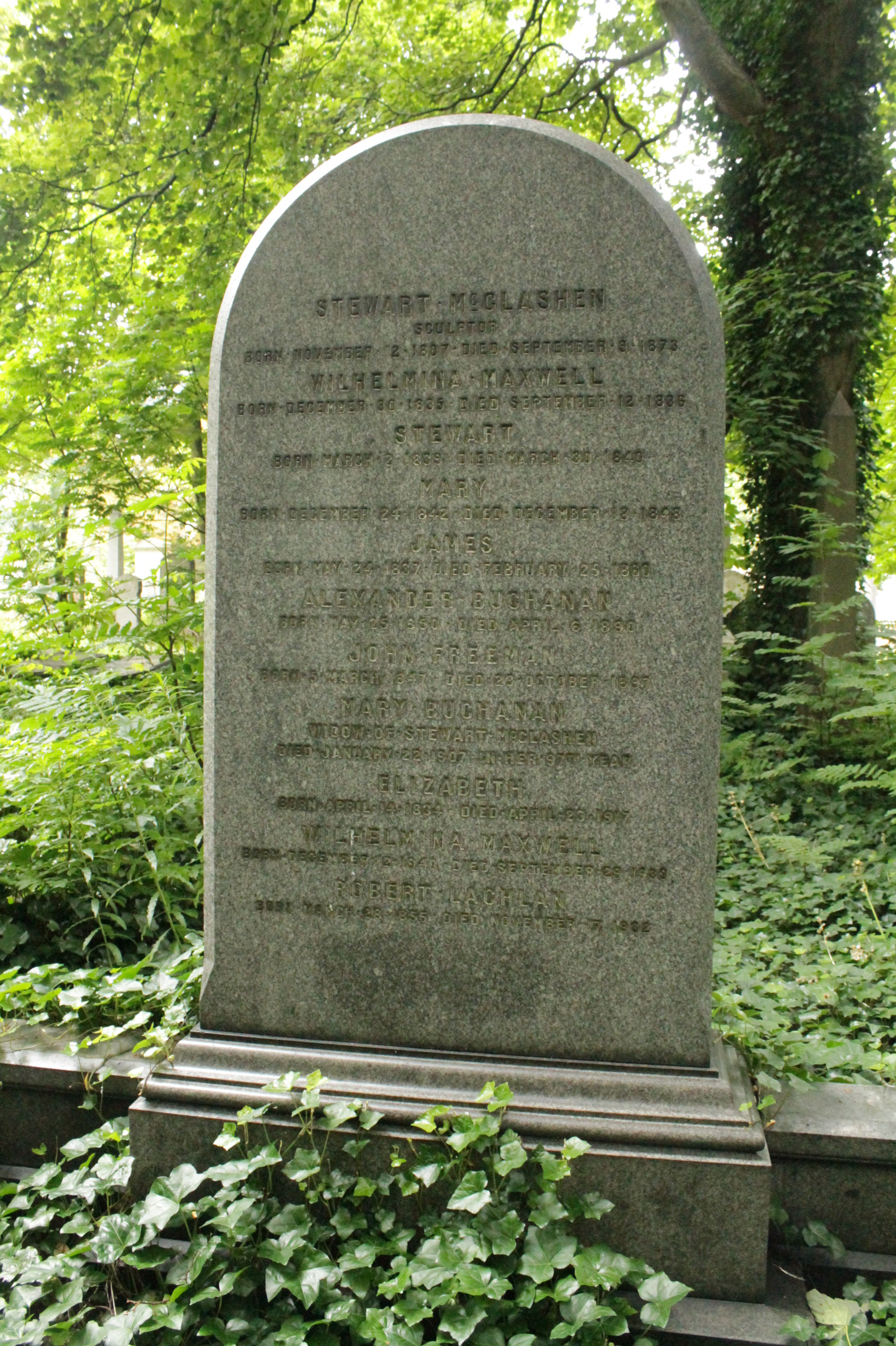
The grave of Stewart McGlashen, Warriston Cemetery

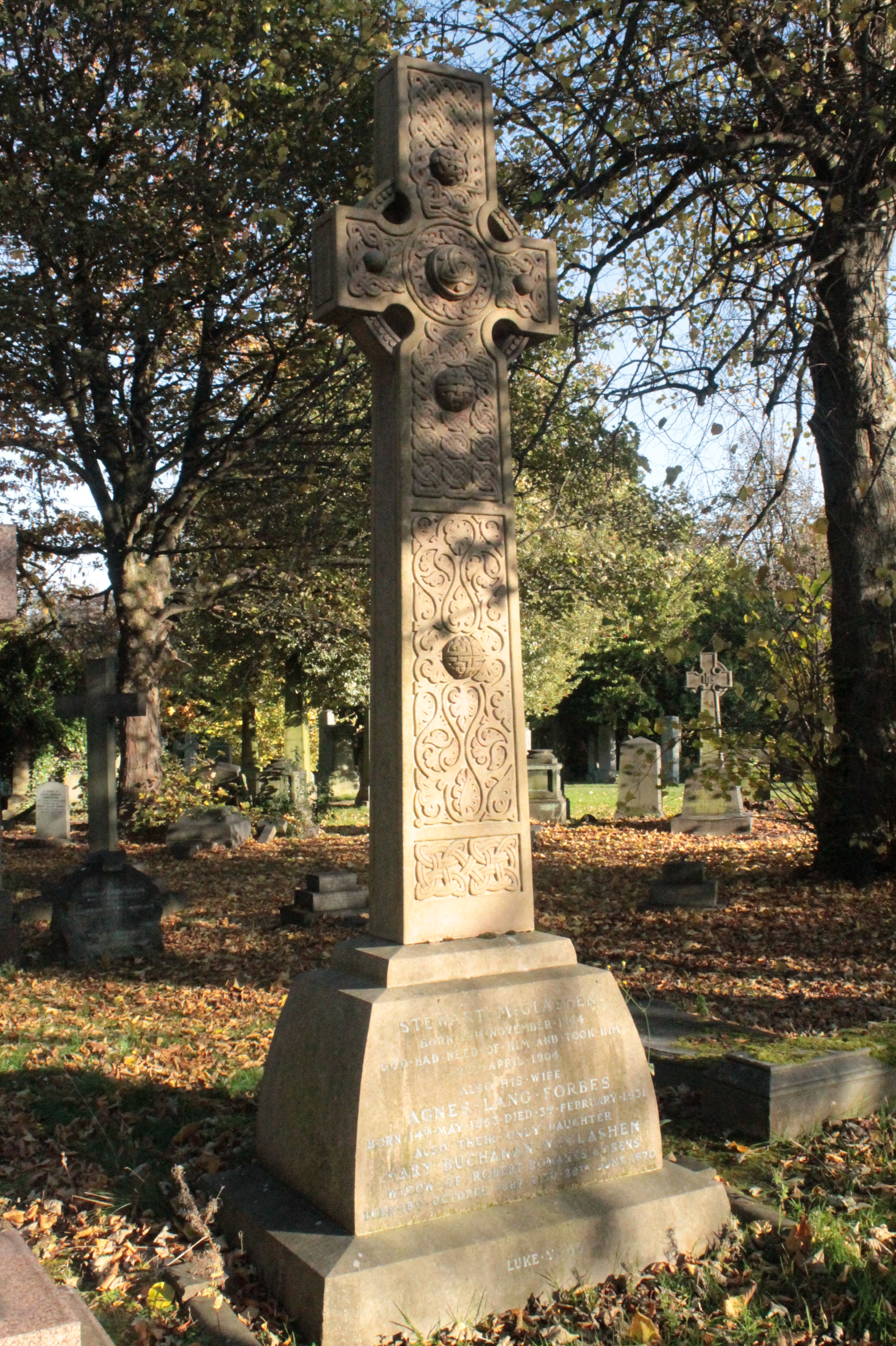
The grave of Stewart McGlashan jr. (1844-1904), Warriston Cemetery, Edinburgh

Stewart McGlashan or McGlashen (2 November 1807 – 9 September 1873) was a Scottish sculptor and mason, responsible for creating the company Stewart McGlashen (sic) which flourished from 1842 to 1974. He was responsible for devising a series of machines capable of creating highly polished granite (sometimes with a mirror finish) for the first time, and capable of carving intricate designs accurately and fast. At his time he was not held in high esteem by sculptors who saw him as undermining their artistry. Despite not being "hand-carved" the artistry value of his work is exceptionally high.

He was very fond of the use of pink and red granites rather than the typical grey granites. His work is usually done as a single piece of granite, except in unusual pieces such as the Dean Cemetery pyramid.

His work was in high demand and changed the face of cemetery design, also adding immeasurably the durability of monuments.

== Life ==
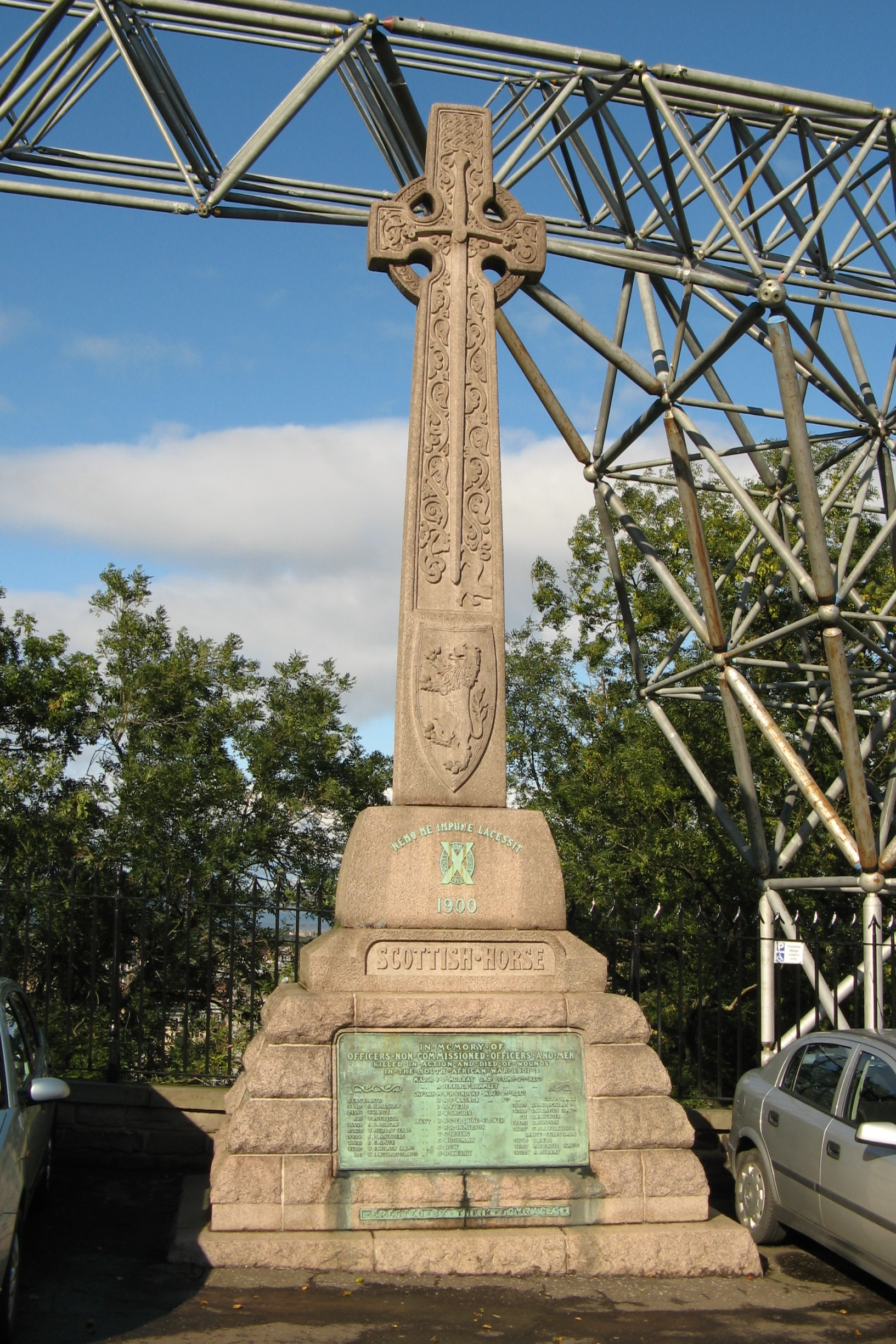
Scottish Horse Monument

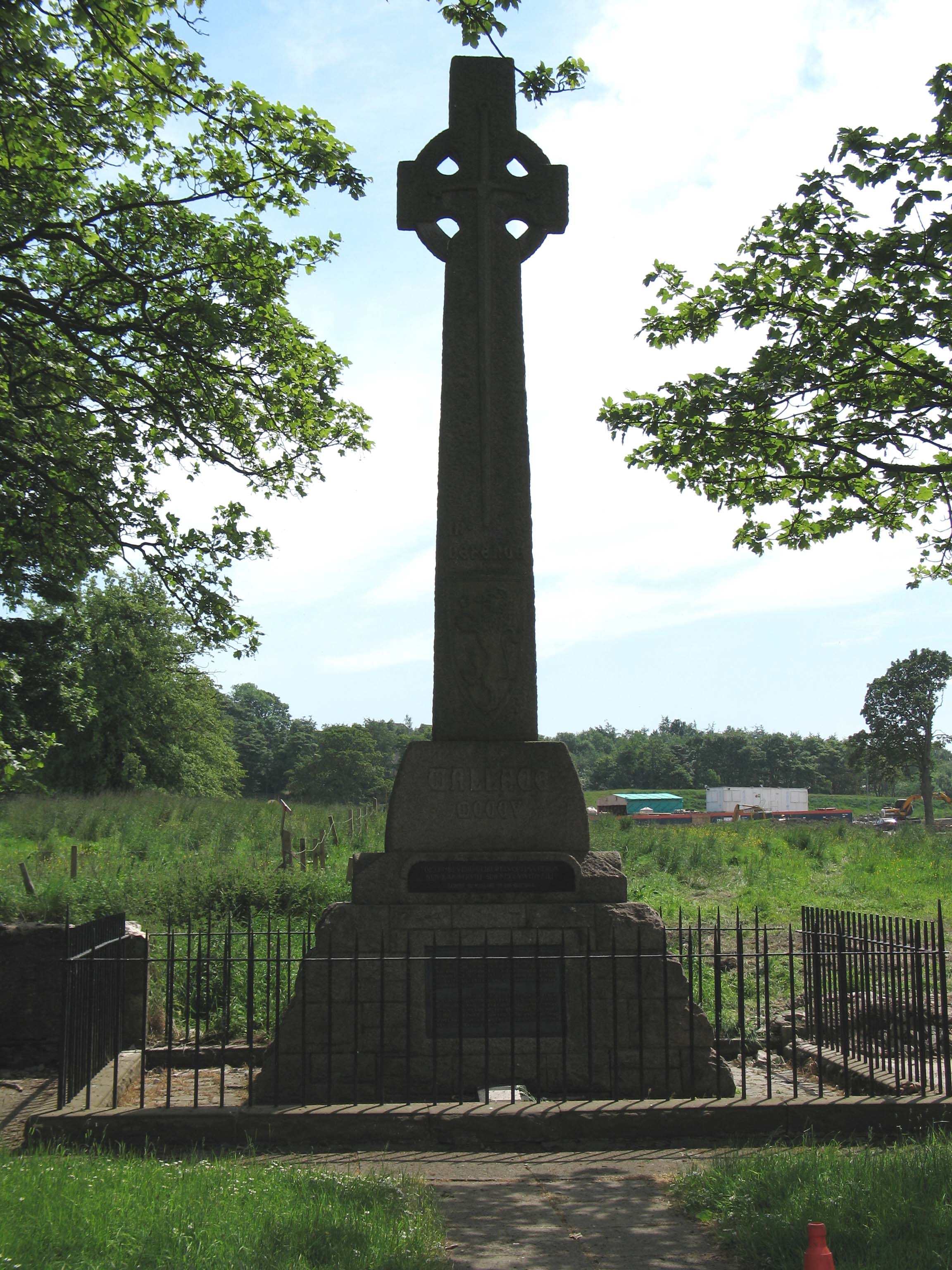
William Wallace Monument, Robroyston

He was born in Campbeltown in western Scotland on 2 November 1807, the son of James McGlashen or McGlashan, a builder. He was christened on 17 November.

In 1842, he set up a monumental mason business at the entrance to the newly opened Southern Necropolis in Glasgow, living at that time at 81 Lawmoor Place, nearby to the south (now demolished).

In 1846 he moved to Edinburgh and set up a yard immediately north of the entrance to Dean Cemetery (later absorbed into the first cemetery extension in 1871). He was living at Canonmills Bridge where he had a second yard and an office. This was more publicly visible, and in theory served Warriston Cemetery in the north of the city.

By 1865 he was living in a house at 6 Huntly Street, close to the Canonmills yard. He brought his son, Stewart McGlashan (1844–1904) into the firm around this time, creating McGlashan & Son. From 1881 (without explanation) the spelling of the company changed to McGlashen. From around 1875 they had a sister company (involved in quarrying) the Edinburgh Granite and Stone Company.

He died of heart disease at home 1 Eyre Place in Canonmills, Edinburgh on 9 September 1873. He is buried in Warriston Cemetery. The modest granite stone lies in the overgrown area to the south-west and is hard to access.

In 1898 the company opened a third yard at 8 Grange Road serving Grange Cemetery.

Stewart McGlashan Jr was also buried in Warriston Cemetery. His grave is marked by a "typical" McGlashan Celtic cross.

The company became a subsidiary of Balfour Beatty in 1974.

The Canonmills office and yard on Canonmills Bridge survived until 2019 when they were demolished for a housing development.

== Family ==
In 1833 he married Mary Buchanan (1810–1907) at the Barony Church in Glasgow. They had at least nine children, two of whom died in infancy.

== Notable works ==
- Dramatic pyramid to Andrew Rutherfurd, Lord Rutherfurd (1853) to a design by William Henry Playfair
- Monument to Major General William Gairdner, Dean Cemetery (1861)
- Monument to Rev Francis Gillies, Dean Cemetery (1862)
- Monument to John Cunningham, Warriston Cemetery (1873)
- Drinking fountain in Edinburgh Castle (1874)
- Monument to Lt John Irving of the Franklin Expedition in Dean Cemetery (1881) including low relief by William Brodie
- Monument to Dr Daniel Richmond, Woodside Cemetery in Paisley (1885)
- Monument to Thomas Glen, Woodside Cemetery in Paisley (1886)
- Monument slab to Robert the Bruce inside Dunfermline Abbey (1889)
- Memorial to Catherine Watson, North Berwick (1890)
- Memorial to Scottish-American soldiers in the American Civil War, Old Calton Burial Ground (1891) including statue of Abraham Lincoln by George Edwin Bissell
- Monument to James Brown Howard, Dean Cemetery (1895)
- Monument to James Wilson of the Scottish Fisheries, Warriston Cemetery (1898)
- Monument to William Wallace in Robroyston (1900)
- Monument to the Scottish Horse Regiment, Edinburgh Castle Esplanade (1905)
- Boer War Memorial in Dunfermline Abbey (1905)
