= Macniven and Cameron =

Scottish printing and stationery company based in Edinburgh

Macniven and Cameron Ltd.
- Formerly: Macniven (1770–1845); Macniven and Cameron Ltd. (1845–1972); Waverley Cameron Ltd. (1972–)
- Type: Private
- Industry: Metallurgy; Stationery
- Founded: 1770 in Balerno
- Founder: Nisbet MacNiven
- Defunct: mid. 1990s
- Fate: The name "Cameron" added after brothers John and Donald Cameron
- Headquarters: Edinburgh, United Kingdom (Note: The company had also factories and locations in London, Birmingham (1900–1964), and Glasgow.)
- Area served: Worldwide
- Products: Dip and fountain pens
- Brands: Waverley

Macniven and Cameron Ltd., later known as Waverley Cameron Ltd., was a printing and stationery company based in Edinburgh, Scotland.

Macniven and Cameron was the leading Scottish manufacturer of dip and fountain pens.

== History ==
In 1770, Nisbet MacNiven established a paper-making business at Balerno, outside Edinburgh. The firm soon diversified into stationery and moved to premises on Blair Street in Edinburgh's Old Town.

In the 1840s, brothers John and Donald Cameron became involved, and the firm became Macniven and Cameron.

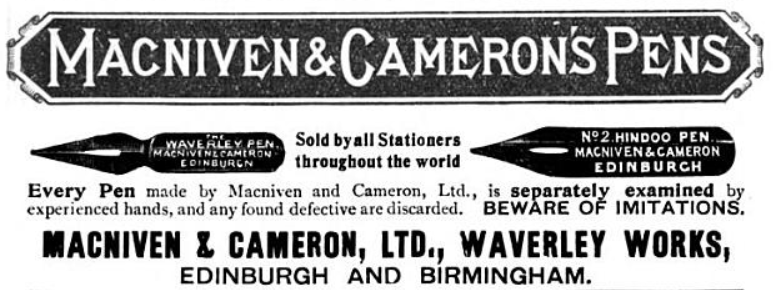
Macniven and Cameron advertisement, ca. 1902

The "Waverley" nib was invented by Duncan Cameron, another brother, and was unusual in having an upturned point, making the ink flow more smoothly on the paper. The "Waverley" was named after the Waverley novels of Sir Walter Scott (1771–1832), which were still hugely popular at the time. The new nib was initially manufactured by Gillott and others, until the company bought a factory in Bordesley, Birmingham, in 1900. It then manufactured its own nibs, fountain pens and printed stationery, until 1964, when the factory closed.

Macniven and Cameron also made pens called the "Pickwick", "Owl", "Phaeton", "Nile", "Hindoo" and "Commercial". The company filed several patents in relation to its fountain pens.

== Pen gallery ==
(Put the mouse on the image to see the model number):

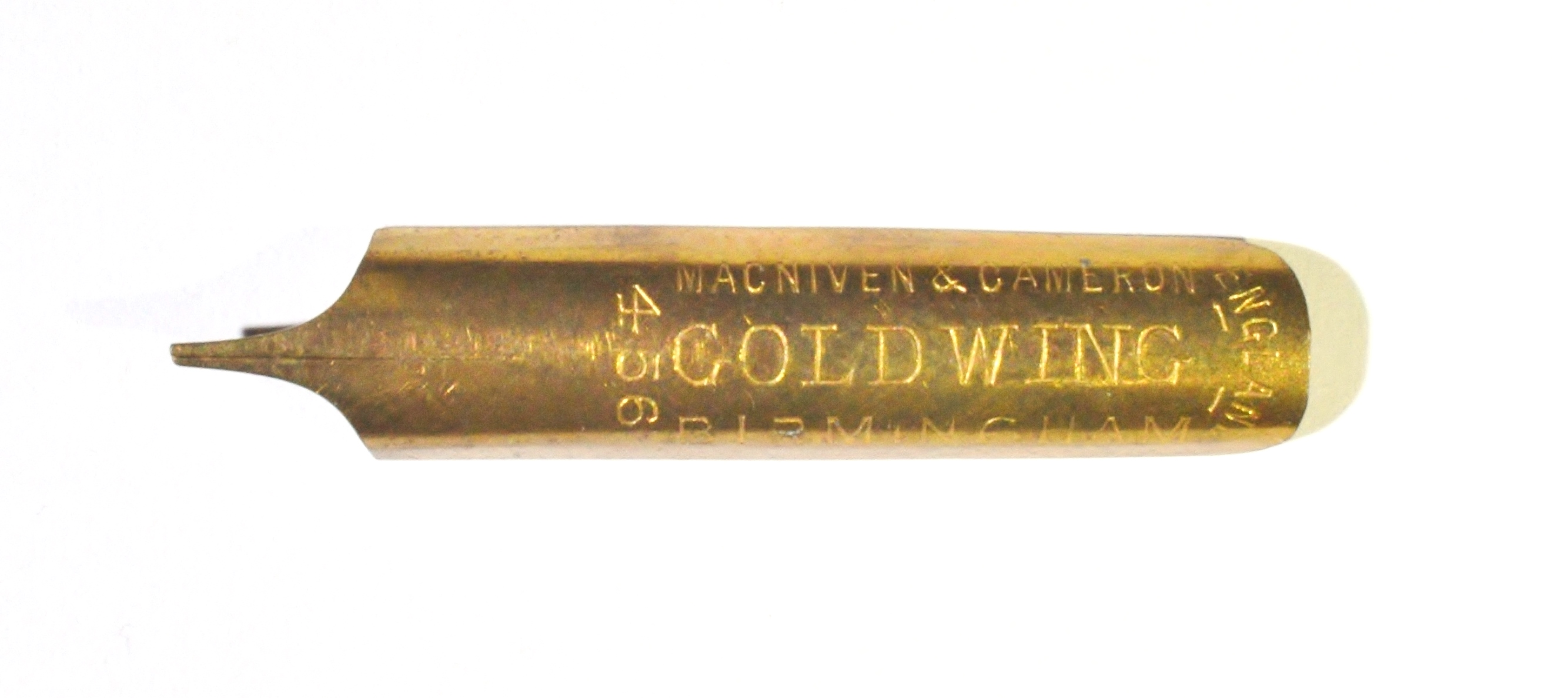
456 Goldwing

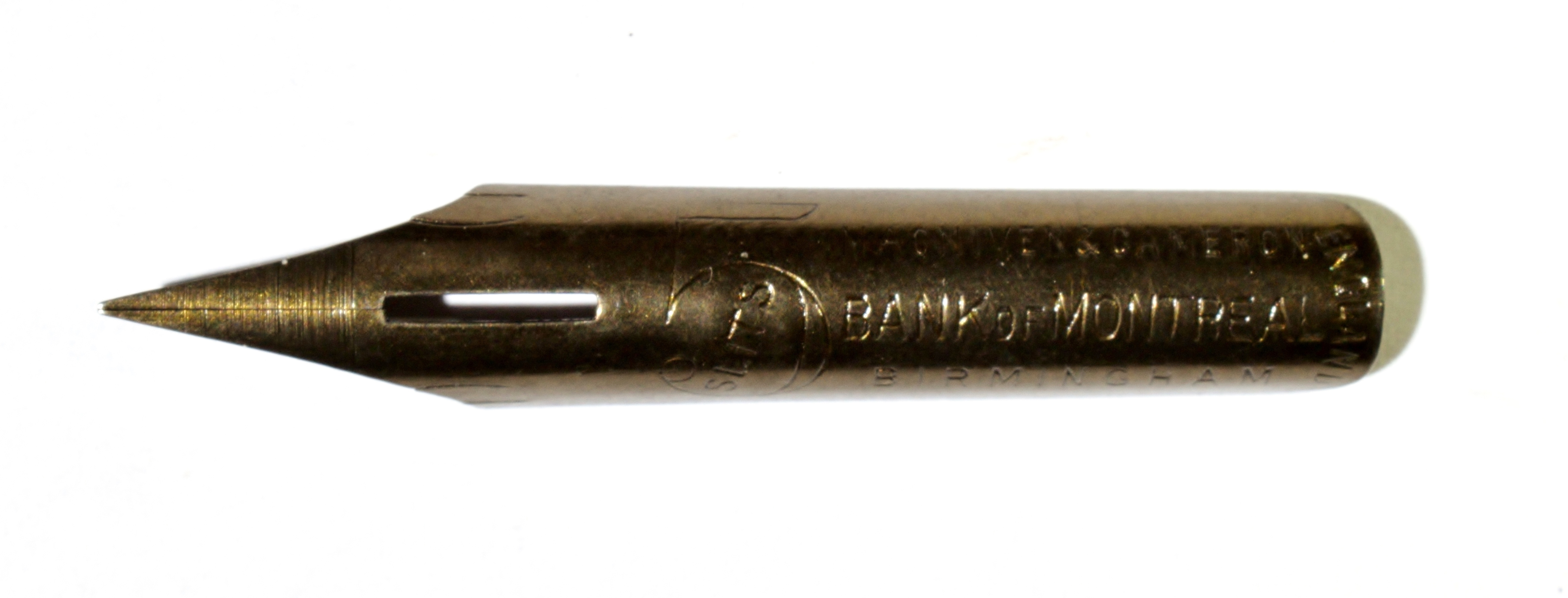
Bank of Montreal

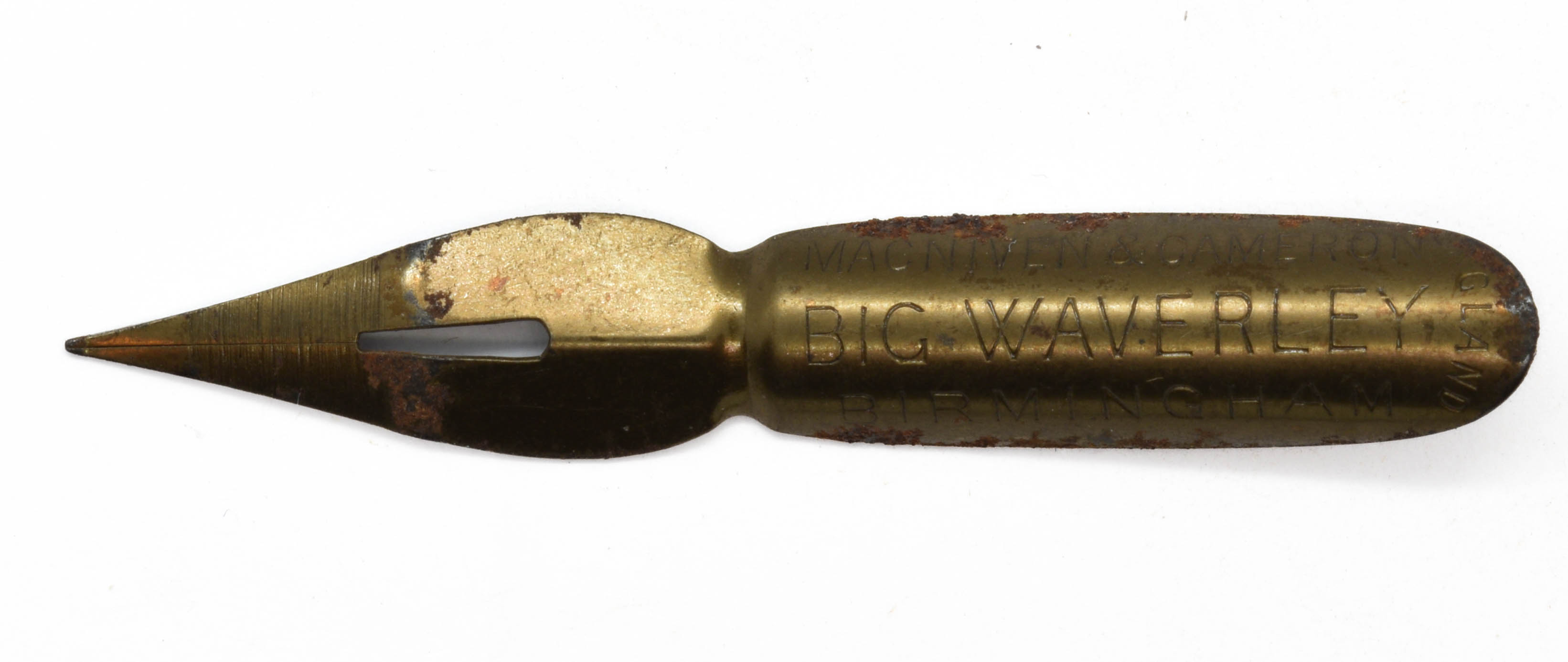
Big Waverley

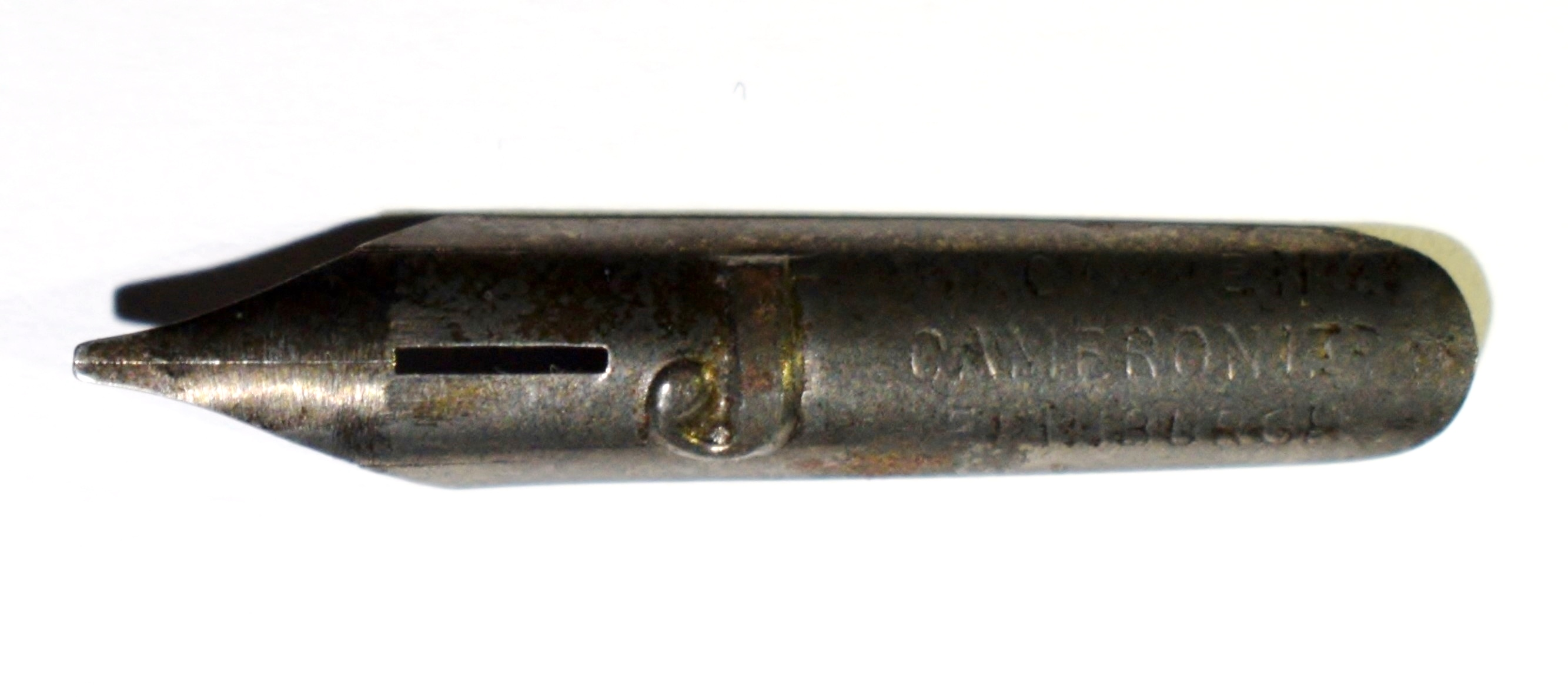
J

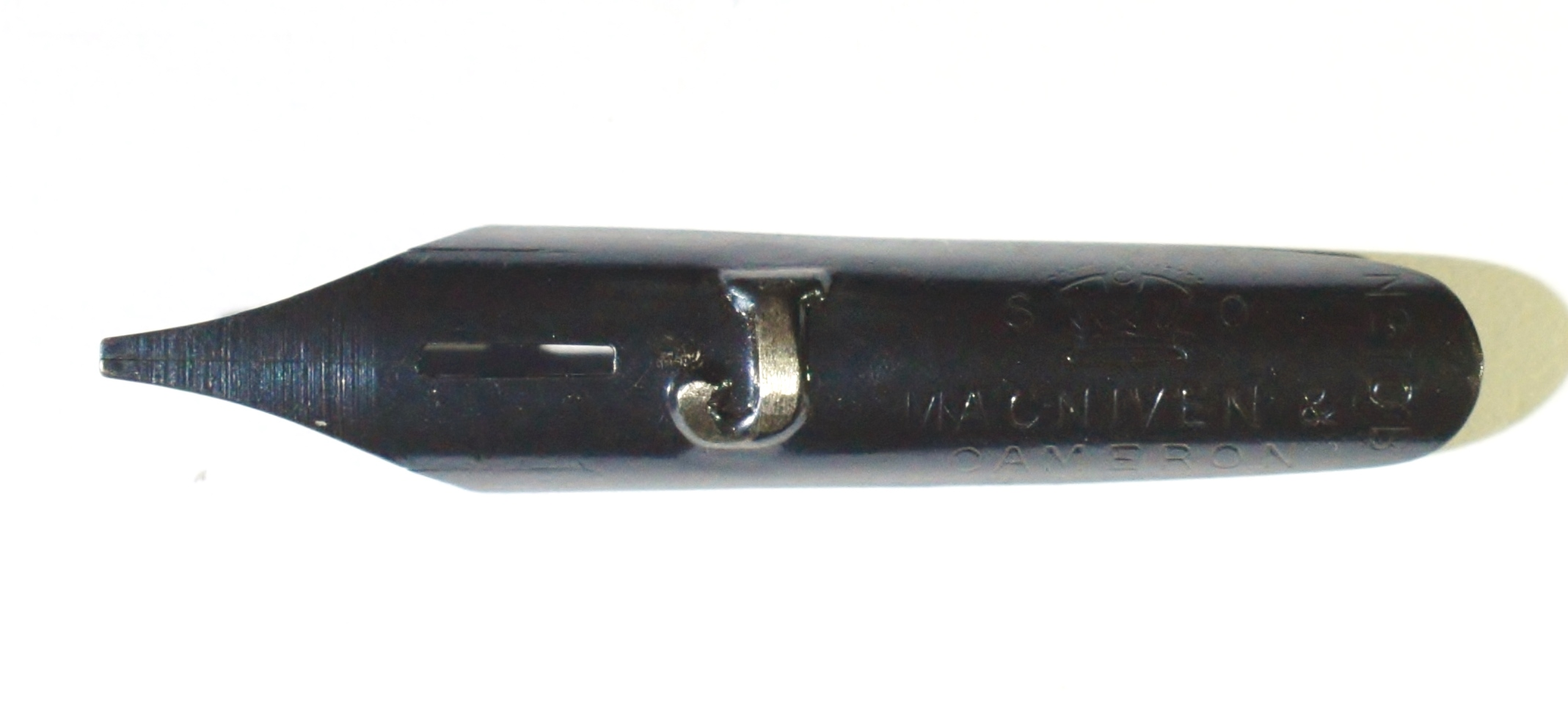
J nº 10

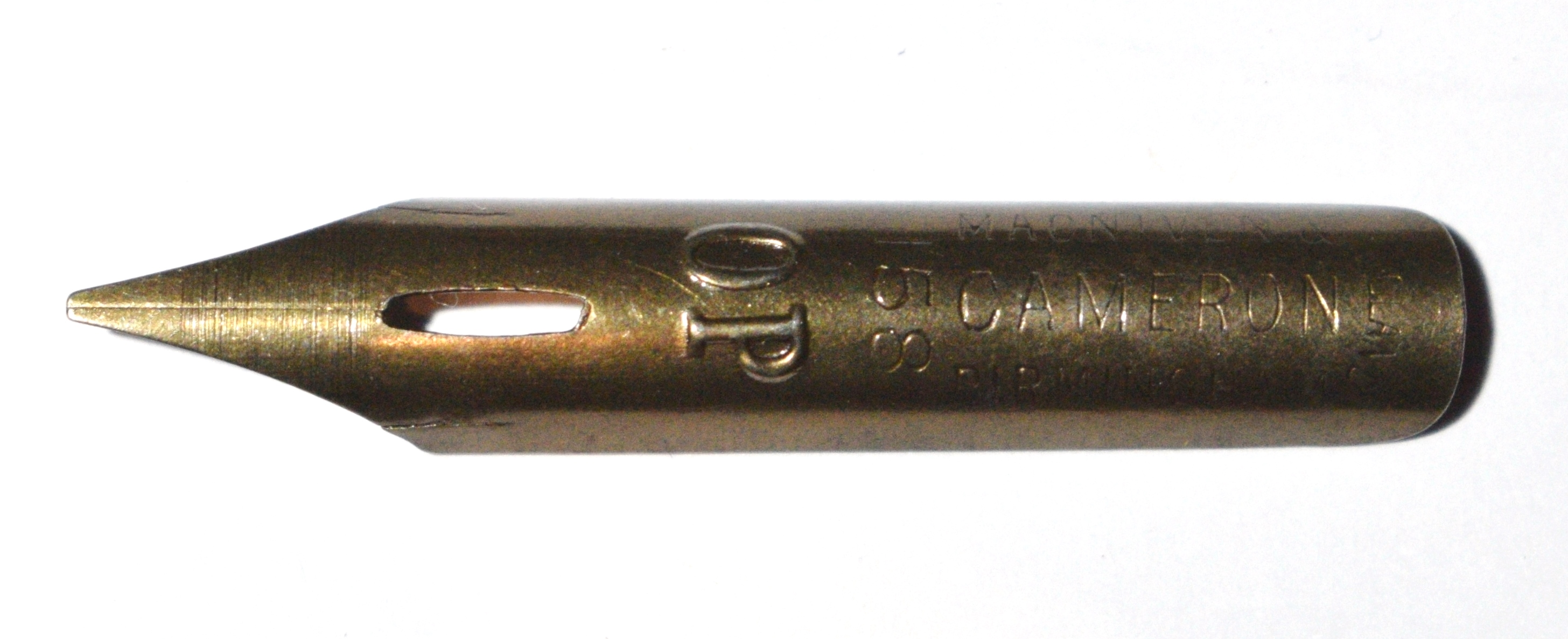
OP

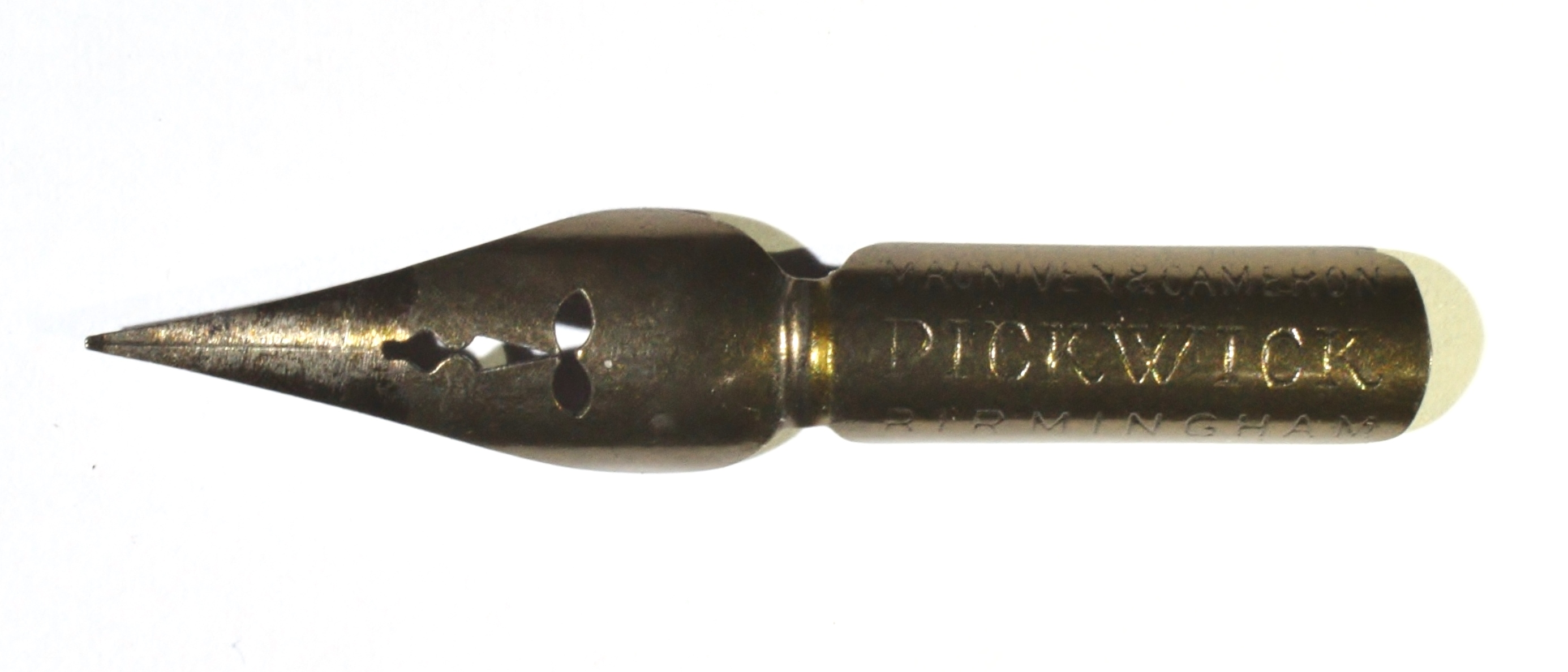
Pickwick

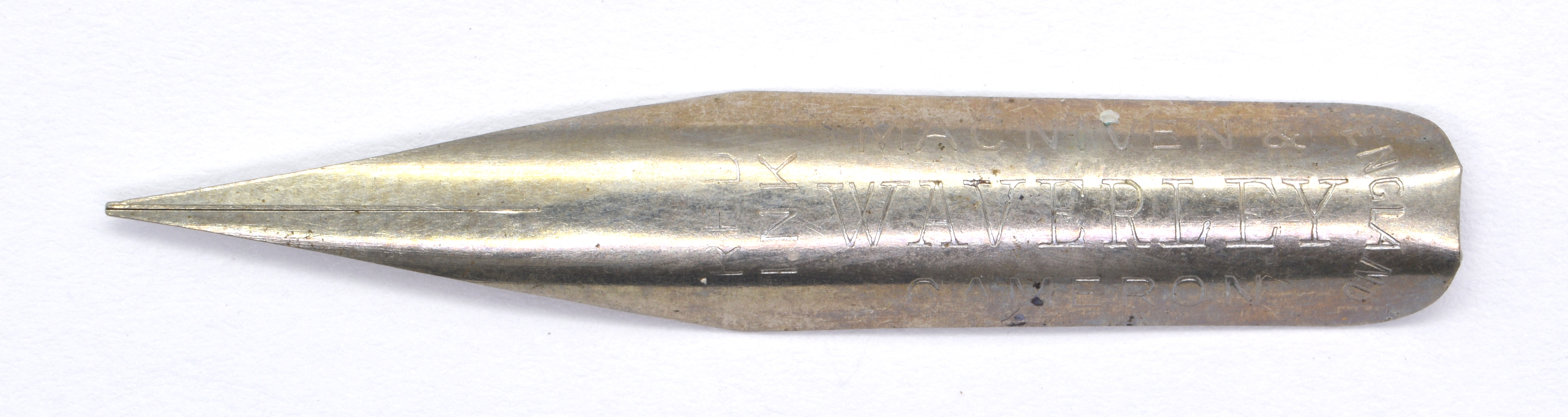
Waverley Red Ink

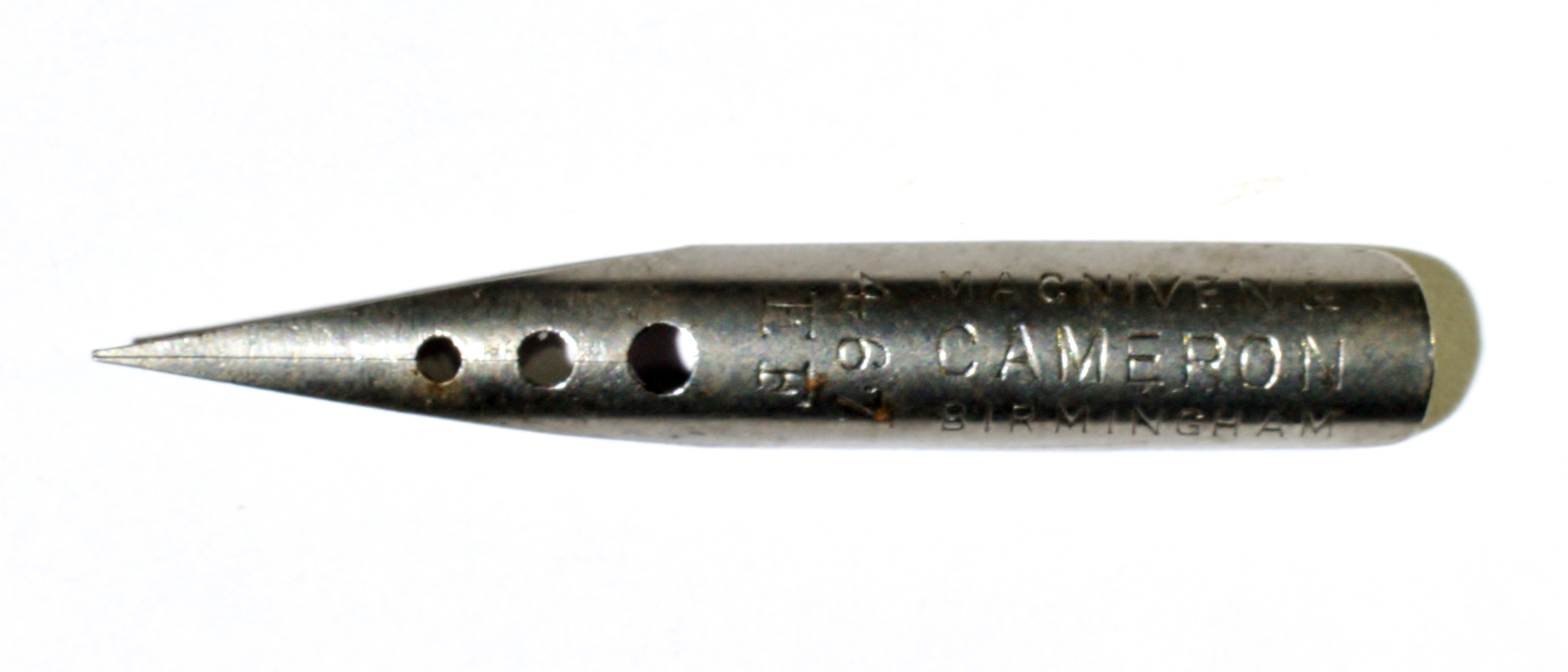
467 EF

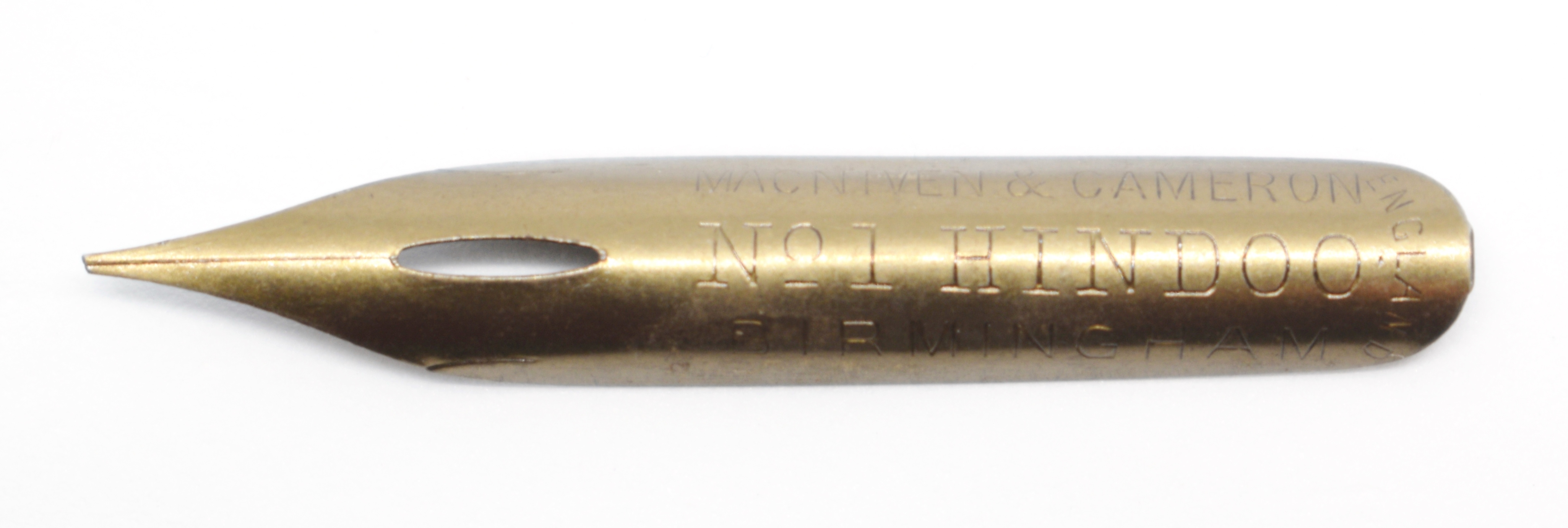
№ 1 Hindoo Pen

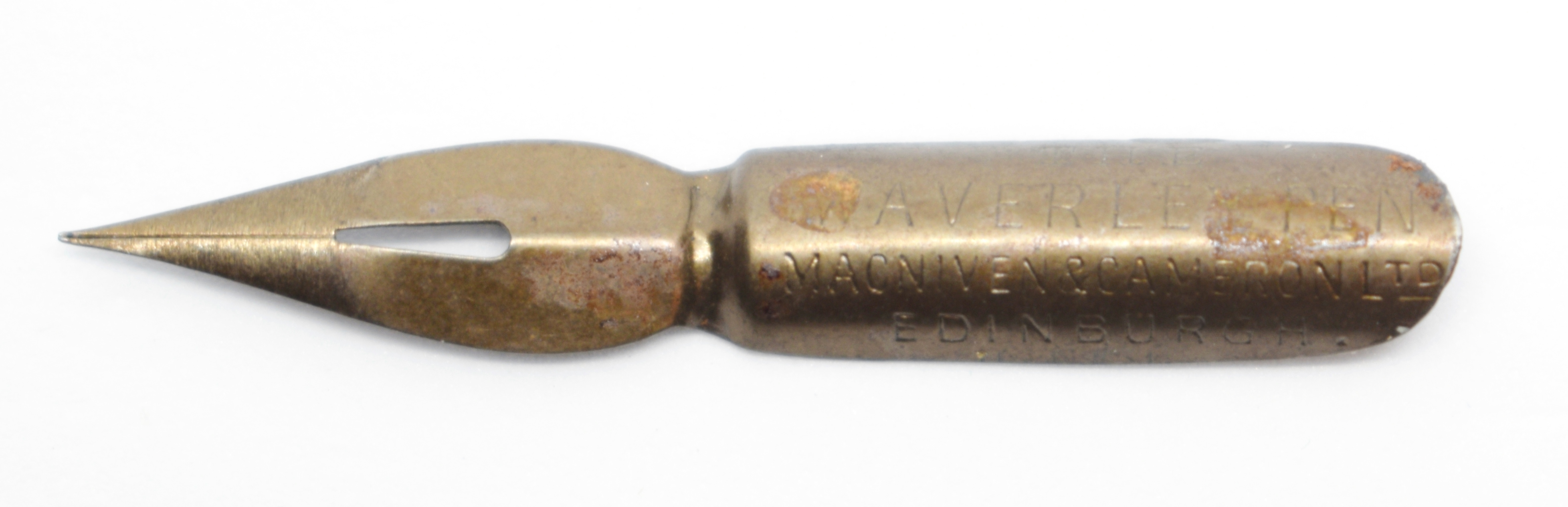
Waverley DSC

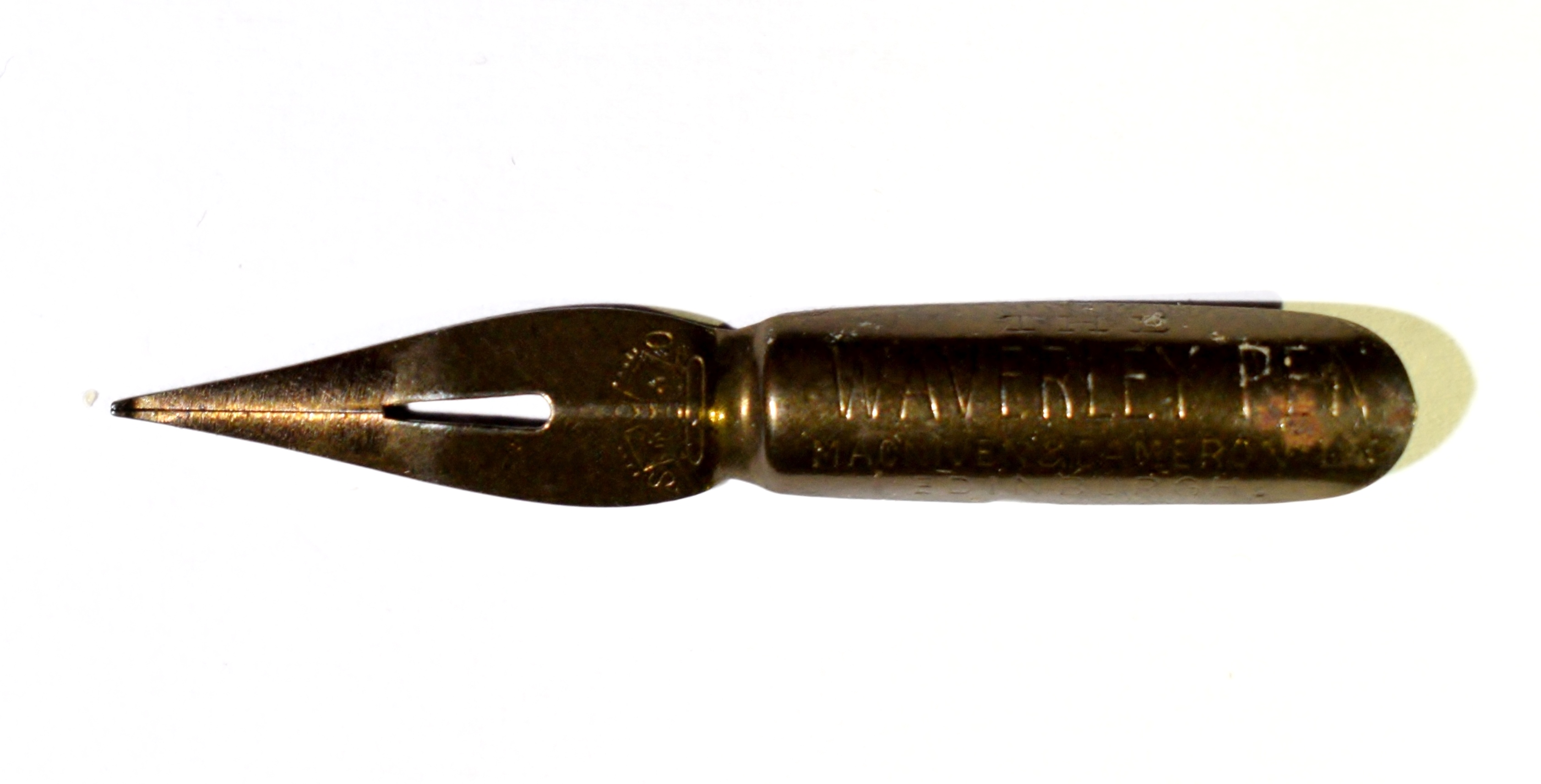
Waverley S

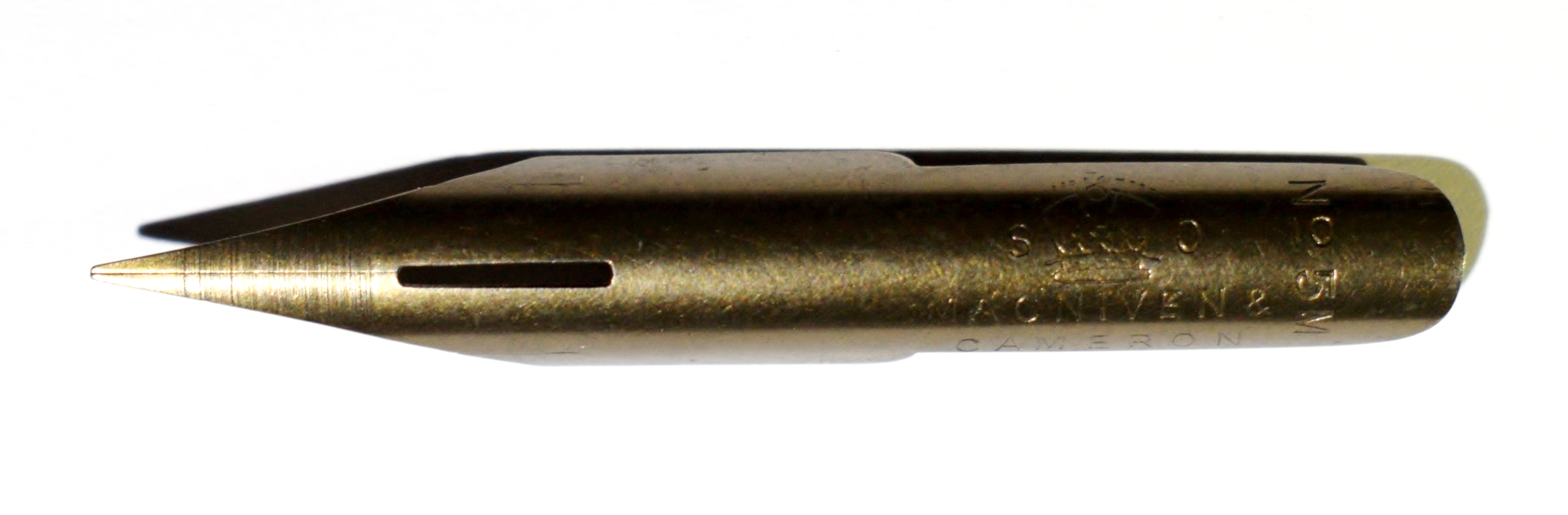
Nº 5 M

== Advertising ==
Some of the company's best known dip pens such as the "Pickwick", the "Owl", and the "Waverley", were sold under the advertising doggerel:

They come as a boon and a blessing to men,
the Pickwick, the Owl and the Waverley Pen.
