= List of people from Edinburgh =

This list of people from Edinburgh contains notable people who were either born in, residents of, or otherwise closely associated with Edinburgh, the capital city of Scotland. The entries in each section are listed alphabetically by surname.

== Architecture ==
- James Adam (1732–1794), architect, son of William Adam
- John Adam (1721–1792), architect, eldest son of William Adam
- Robert Adam (1728–1792), architect of Charlotte Square and other notable buildings, son of William Adam
- William Adam (1689–1748), architect of Edinburgh Royal Infirmary, and father of James, John, and Robert Adam
- Sir Robert Rowand Anderson (1834–1921), architect whose works include the Scottish National Portrait Gallery
- Isobel Hogg Kerr Beattie (1900–1970), possibly the first woman to practise architecture in Scotland
- Alexander Black (c. 1790–1858), architect, who acted as Superintendent of Works for George Heriot's School
- Hippolyte Blanc (1844–1917), architect
- Sir William Bruce (c. 1630–1710), designer of Holyrood Palace
- David Bryce (1803–1876), architect
- William Burn (1789–1870), architect
- Edward Calvert (c. 1847 – 1914), domestic architect
- Stewart Henbest Capper (1859–1925), architect of Ramsay Gardens
- John Alexander Carfrae (1868–1947)
- John Chesser (1819–1892), architect largely based in Edinburgh
- David Cousin (1809–1878), architect, landscape architect and planner, Edinburgh's City Superintendent of Works
- James Craig (1739–1795), designer of Edinburgh New Town
- Francis William Deas (1862–1951), Arts and Crafts architect and landscape designer
- Alexander Edward (1651–1708), Episcopalian clergyman, draughtsman, architect and landscape designer
- Archibald Elliot (1760–1823), works including the Regent Bridge, the Waterloo Hotel and Calton Prison
- Reginald Francis Joseph Fairlie (1883–1952), architect of the National Library of Scotland
- James Leslie Findlay (1868–1952), son of John Ritchie Findlay
- Malcolm Fraser (born 1959), architect of the Scottish Poetry Library
- Andrew Frazer (died 1792), soldier and engineer, architect of St Andrew's Church, George Street, Edinburgh
- Sir James Gowans (1821–1890), architect and builder
- James Gillespie Graham (1776–1855), architect
- Thomas Hamilton (1784–1858), architect
- Robert Hurd (1905–1963), conservation architect
- George Meikle Kemp (1795–1844), carpenter, draughtsman, and architect, best known for designing the Scott Monument
- John Lessels (1809–1883), architect
- Ian Lindsay (1906–1966), architect
- Robert Lorimer (1864–1929), architect, whose works include the Scottish National War Memorial
- David MacGibbon (1831–1902), architect and president of the Edinburgh Architectural Association
- Ebenezer James MacRae (1881–1951), City Architect
- Sir Robert Matthew (1906–1975), a leading proponent of modernism
- Sir Frank Charles Mears (1880–1953), architect and planning consultant
- Sydney Mitchell (1856–1930), architect
- John Mylne, mason, particularly on George Heriot's Hospital
- Robert Mylne (1733–1811), architect and civil engineer, designer of Blackfriars Bridge in London
- John Paterson (died 1832), architect who assisted with the Old College, University of Edinburgh
- Robert Hamilton Paterson (1843–1911), partner in the architectural practice of Hamilton-Paterson and Rhind
- John Dick Peddie (1824–1891), architect and politician
- John More Dick Peddie (1853–1921), architect
- Frederick Thomas Pilkington (1832–1898), architect in the High Victorian Gothic style
- William Henry Playfair (1790–1857), architect of the National Gallery of Scotland and the Royal Scottish Academy
- Benjamin Marcus Priteca (1889–1971), theatre architect
- Robert Reid (1774–1856), King's architect and surveyor for Scotland
- David Rhind (1808–1883), architect
- Sir Thomas Duncan Rhind (1871–1927), architect and military figure
- Witold Rybczynski (born 1943), architect
- James Smith (c. 1645–1731), architect
- Sir Basil Spence (1907–1976), architect, notably associated with Coventry Cathedral
- Thomas S Tait (1882–1954), prominent Modernist architect
- Sir Andrew Thomas Taylor (1850–1937), architect and Conservative Party municipal councillor
- William Wallace (died 1631), mason, particularly on George Heriot's Hospital
- William Weir (1865–1950), architect
- Patrick Wilson (1798–1871), school architect
- Robert Wilson (1834–1907), school architect

== Arts ==
- John Brown Abercromby (1843–1929), artist varying from traditional to avant-garde modernist
- Robert Adamson (1821–1848), photographer
- Bay City Rollers, pop group of the 1970s
- Andrew Bell (1726–1809), engraver and printer, co-founder of Encyclopædia Britannica
- Jemima Blackburn, (1823–1909), painter and illustrator
- William Bonnar (1800–1863), painter of portraits, and history and genre paintings
- Ewen Bremner (born 1972), actor
- Rory Bremner (born 1961), impressionist and comedian
- Sandy Brown (1929–1975), jazz clarinetist
- Mary Cameron (1865–1921), artist who painted mainly Spanish scenes
- Nicky Campbell (born 1961), radio and television presenter
- Ian Charleson (1949–1990), actor
- Sean Connery (1930–2020), actor
- Ronnie Corbett (1930–2016), comedian and actor, one of The Two Ronnies
- David Millar Craig (1878–1965), cellist and BBC personality
- William Crozier (1893–1930), landscape painter
- Finlay Jefferson Currie (1878–1968), actor of stage, screen and television
- Mark Daly (1887–1957), stage and film actor
- Richard Demarco (born 1930), artist and promoter of visual and performing arts
- Thomas Doherty (born 1995), actor, singer and dancer
- Daniel Dow (1732–1783), fiddler, composer, teacher and concert organiser
- Al Fairweather (1927–1993), jazz musician
- Bridget Forsyth (born 1940), actress, Thelma in Whatever Happened to the Likely Lads
- Kirsty Gallacher (born 1976), television presenter
- Henry Snell Gamley (1865–1928), sculptor specialising in war memorials and tomb sculpture
- Ncuti Gatwa (born 1992), actor
- Andrew Geddes (1783–1844), portrait painter and etcher
- William Geissler (1894–1963), artist known for watercolours of the natural world
- Sir William George Gillies (1898–1973), landscape and still life painter
- Iain Glen (born 1961), actor
- Isabella Glyn (1823–1889), actress
- Hannah Gordon (born 1941), actress
- Nathaniel Gow (1763–1831), musician and composer, fourth son of Niel Gow
- Mary Grant (1831–1908), sculptor
- Patrick Grant (born 1972), fashion designer and entrepreneur
- Stan Greig (1930–2012), jazz pianist, drummer and bandleader
- Amelia Robertson Hill (1820–1904), sculptor, wife of David Octavius Hill
- David Octavius Hill (1802–1870), painter and photography pioneer at Hill & Adamson, husband of Amelia Robertson Hill
- John Hutchison, (1832–1910), sculptor
- George Jamesone (or Jameson) (c. 1587–1644), Scotland's first eminent portrait painter
- Alexander Johnston (1815–1891), known for genre and history paintings
- Eugene Kelly (born 1965), member of The Vaselines
- Grant Kirkhope (born 1962), composer
- Sir Harry Lauder (1870–1950), vaudeville singer, entertainer and composer
- Robert Scott Lauder (1803–1869), artist and portrait painter
- John Leslie (born 1965), television presenter
- William Home Lizars (1788–1859), painter and engraver
- Hew Lorimer (1907–1993), sculptor, son of Robert Lorimer
- John Henry Lorimer (1856–1936), portraitist and genre painter, brother of Robert Lorimer
- Jack Lowden (born 1990), actor
- Dr. James Pittendrigh MacGillivray (1856–1938), sculptor
- Robert Mackintosh (c. 1745–1807), "Red Rob", composer and violinist
- Sir William MacTaggart (1903–1981), painter known for landscapes
- Magnus Magnusson (1929–2007), television presenter and author
- Shirley Manson (born 1966), lead singer of the band Garbage
- John Maxwell (1905–1962), painter of landscapes and imaginative subjects
- Horatio McCulloch (1806–1867), landscape painter
- Sandy McDade (born 1964), actress
- Greg McHugh (born 1980), actor
- Frances McKee (born 1966), member of The Vaselines; namesake of Kurt Cobain and Courtney Love's daughter
- William Miller, 19th-century engraver and watercolourist
- Jacob More (1740–1793), landscape painter
- Alexander Nasmyth (1758–1840), landscape and portrait painter
- Nina Nesbitt (born 1994), singer-songwriter
- Eduardo Paolozzi (1924–2005), sculptor and artist, born in Leith
- Emily Murray Paterson (1855–1934), artist connected with Glasgow School
- Robin Philipson (1916–1992), knight, Lancashire-born painter influential on Scottish art scene
- Pilot, pop group of the 1970s
- Gail Porter (born 1971), television presenter
- Finley Quaye (born 1974), singer-songwriter
- John Rae (born 1966), jazz musician and composer
- Sir Henry Raeburn (1756–1823), portrait artist
- Allan Ramsay (1713–1784), painter
- Anne Redpath (1895–1967), artist best known for domestic still lifes
- John Rhind (1828–1892), sculptor
- Ian Richardson, (1934–2007), actor
- David Roberts (1796–1864), painter and lithographer
- Alexander Runciman (1736–1785), painter of historical and mythological subjects
- John Runciman (1744–1768/9), painter known for Biblical and literary scenes, brother of Alexander
- Alastair Sim, (1900–1976), character actor
- Robert Archibald Smith (1780–1829), composer and musical conductor in St George's Church, Edinburgh
- Sir John Robert Steell (1804–1891), sculptor, statue of Sir Walter Scott at the Scott Monument
- Iain Stirling (born 1988), comedian, voice-over actor and television presenter
- Alexander Stoddart (born 1959), neoclassical sculptor
- Ken Stott, (born 1954), film and television actor
- Julian Wagstaff (born 1970), composer
- Ottilie Maclaren Wallace (1875–1947), sculptor
- George Watson (1767–1837), painter
- Louis Whirter (1873–1932), artist, etcher, illustrator and inventor
- John Muir Wood (1805–1892), musician, piano manufacturer, music publisher and early amateur photographer
- John Michael Wright (1617–1694), portrait painter in the Baroque style
- Grace Harriet Warrack (1855–1932), editor, translator and artist

== Authors ==
- Patrick Abercromby (1656–c. 1716), physician and antiquarian
- H. B. Acton (1908–1974), academic in field of political philosophy
- Alexander Adam (1741–1809), teacher and writer on classical literature
- Thomas Aird (1802–1876), poet and editor of the Edinburgh Weekly Journal
- Archibald Alison (1757–1839), Episcopal priest and essayist
- Sir Archibald Alison, 1st Baronet (1792–1867), advocate and historian
- Adam Anderson (c. 1692–1765), economist
- Alan Orr Anderson (1879–1958), historian and compiler
- James Anderson (1662–1728), antiquary and historian
- James Robertson Anderson (1811–1895), stage actor and dramatist
- Joseph Anderson, antiquarian, museum keeper and author (1832–1916)
- Lin Anderson (living), crime novelist and screenwriter
- Hugo Arnot of Balcormo (1749–1786), advocate, writer and campaigner, History of Edinburgh (1779)
- Kate Atkinson (born 1951), novelist
- William Edmondstoune Aytoun (1813–1865), poet
- R. M. Ballantyne (1825–1894), author of The Coral Island and other books for boys
- Iain Banks (1954–2013), novelist
- Anne Bannerman (1765–1829), poet
- J. M. Barrie (1860–1937), author and dramatist
- Meg Bateman (born 1959), academic, poet and short story writer
- John Stuart Blackie (1809–1895), scholar and man of letters
- William Garden Blaikie (1820–1899), divine, writer, biographer and temperance reformer
- Alan Bold (1943–1998), poet, biographer and journalist
- Alexander Bower (fl. 1804–1830), biographer
- George Mackay Brown (1921–1996), poet and storyteller
- John Brown (1784–1858), minister and theologian
- John Brown (1810–1882), physician and essayist
- Peter Hume Brown (1849–1918), historian; first Edinburgh University professor of Scottish history
- Georgina Bruce (living), horror writer
- George Buchanan (1506–1582), historian and humanist scholar
- Gilbert Burnet (1643–1715), theologian, historian and Bishop of Salisbury
- John Burnet (1863–1928), classicist
- John Hill Burton (1809–1881), advocate, historian and economist
- Angus Calder (1942–2008), academic, writer, historian, poet and literary editor
- Jenni Calder (née Daiches) (born 1941), literary historian
- Peter Ritchie Calder, Baron Ritchie-Calder of Balmashanner (1906–1982), socialist author, journalist and academic
- Henry Calderwood (1830–1897), minister of religion and philosopher
- Thomas Carlyle (1795–1881), philosopher, satirist, historian and University of Edinburgh rector
- Thomas Chalmers (1780–1847), minister of religion, professor of theology, political economist and a leader of the Church of Scotland and the Free Church of Scotland (1843–1900)
- Robert Chambers (1802–1871), publisher, geologist, evolutionary thinker and journal editor
- Reverend Professor Alexander Campbell Cheyne (1924–2006), scholar of church history
- Vere Gordon Childe (1892–1957), Australian archaeologist and philologist, academic at University of Edinburgh
- Henry Thomas, Lord Cockburn (1779–1854), author of Memorials of His Time
- Stewart Conn (born 1936), poet and Edinburgh Makar (2002–2005)
- Anne Ross Cousin (1824–1906), poet, musician and songwriter
- Helen Cruickshank (1886–1975), poet and suffragette
- Anne Jane Cupples (1839–1896), writer and populariser of science
- David Daiches (1912–2005), literary historian and literary scholar and writer
- David Dalrymple, Lord Hailes (1726–1792), advocate, judge and historian
- Sir John Graham Dalyell (1775–1851), antiquary and naturalist
- Christine De Luca (born 1947), poet, writing in English and Shetland dialect
- Tom Devine (born 1945), historian of Scotland
- William Croft Dickinson (1897–1963), English historian and professor at University of Edinburgh
- Gordon Donaldson (1913–1993), historian
- Gavin Douglas (1474–1522), medieval poet
- Sir Arthur Conan Doyle (1859–1930), creator of Sherlock Holmes
- William Drummond of Hawthornden (1585–1649), poet
- William Dunbar (c. 1460 – c. 1520), medieval poet
- Dorothy Dunnett (1923–2001), historical novelist
- John Fardell (born 1967), cartoonist, author and illustrator
- Adam Ferguson (1723–1816), philosopher and historian
- Robert Fergusson (1750–1774), poet
- James Frederick Ferrier (1808–1864), metaphysical writer, introduced the term epistemology
- Susan Edmonstone Ferrier (1782–1854), novelist
- Ian Hamilton Finlay, (1925–2006), poet, writer, artist and gardener
- John Fleming (1785–1857), minister of religion, naturalist, zoologist and geologist
- William Fowler (c. 1560–1612), poet, writer, courtier and translator
- Sir William Fraser (1816–1898), solicitor and specialist in ancient Scottish history, palaeography and genealogy
- Iain Gale (born 1959), journalist and author of military novels
- Robert Garioch (1909–1981), poet
- Lesley Glaister (born 1956), novelist and playwright, Writer in Residence at University of Edinburgh
- Reverend Dr Robert Gordon (1786–1853), minister of religion and writer
- Kenneth Grahame (1859–1932), author of The Wind in the Willows
- James Grant (1822–1887), novelist and historian, Old And New Edinburgh
- Sir Alexander Gray (1882–1968), civil servant, economist, academic, translator and poet
- James Gregory (1753–1821), physician and classicist
- John Gregory (1724–1773), physician, medical writer and moralist
- Andrew Greig (born 1951), novelist, poet and writer on climbing
- David Greig (born 1969), playwright and theatre director
- Sir William Hamilton, 9th Baronet (1788–1856), metaphysician
- James Hannay (1827–1873), novelist, journalist and diplomat
- Janet Harden (1776–c.1837), diarist
- William Hardie (1862–1916), classical scholar, Professor of Humanity at University of Edinburgh
- Zinnie Harris (born 1972), playwright, theatre director and professor at Saint Andrew's University
- George Campbell Hay (1915–1984), multi-lingual poet and translator
- Hamish Henderson (1919–2002), poet, songwriter, soldier and catalyst for Scotland's folk revival
- Robert Henry (1718–1790), minister of religion and historian
- Peter Hoffmann (born 1956), author and sportsman
- Alexander Taylor Innes (1833–1912), lawyer, biographer and church historian
- Cosmo Nelson Innes (1798–1874), advocate, judge historian and antiquary
- Alan Jackson (born 1938), poet
- Kathleen Jamie (born 1962), poet
- John Jamieson (1759–1838), minister of religion, lexicographer, philologist and antiquary
- Robert Alan Jamieson (born 1958), Shetland poet and novelist who grew up in the crofting community of Sandness
- Francis Jeffrey, Lord Jeffrey (1773–1850), judge, literary critic and editor of the Edinburgh Review
- Arthur Berriedale Keith (1879–1944), constitutional lawyer, Sanskrit scholar, Indologist and professor at University of Edinburgh
- Sir Ludovic Kennedy (1919–2009), journalist, broadcaster and author
- Philip Kerr (born 1956), novelist
- Sir Thomas Dick Lauder (1784–1848), academic, novelist, writer
- John Parker Lawson (died 1852), clergyman of Episcopal Church of Scotland and historian
- Frances Leviston (born 1982), poet
- Frederic Lindsay (1933–2013), crime writer
- John Logan (1748–1788), minister of religion, dramatist and historian
- Michael Lynch (born 1946), historian
- Mary Lyschinska (1849–1937), educator and author
- Thomas Babington Macaulay (1800–1859), poet and Edinburgh MP
- Norman MacCaig (1910–1996), poet
- Alexander R. MacEwen (1851–1916), writer, professor and Moderator of United Free Church of Scotland
- Duncan Ban MacIntyre (1724–1812), Gaelic poet and a constable of Edinburgh City Guard
- Angus Mackay (born 1939), historian and Hispanist specialising in Later Medieval Spain
- Sir Compton Mackenzie (1883–1972), author
- Sir George Mackenzie of Rosehaugh ("Bluidy Mackenzie", 1636/1638–1691), lawyer, Lord Advocate, essayist and legal writer
- Henry Mackenzie (1745–1831), lawyer, novelist and miscellanist
- Donald MacKinnon (1839–1914), Celtic scholar, first Professor of Celtic Studies at University of Edinburgh
- Sorley MacLean (1911–1996), Gaelic poet
- Hector Macneill (1746–1818), poet and songwriter
- Hector Macpherson (1851–1924), prolific writer and journalist
- David MacRitchie (1851–1925), folklorist and antiquarian
- Magnus Magnusson (1929–2007), television presenter and author
- James Maidment (1793–1879), antiquary and collector, advocate in disputed peerage cases
- Bruce Marshall (1899–1987), author of Father Malachy's Miracle
- Sir Theodore Martin (1816–1909), poet, biographer and translator
- James David Marwick (1826–1908), lawyer, historian and town clerk
- David Masson (1822–1907), literary critic and historian
- David I. Masson (1915–2007), science-fiction writer and librarian
- Brian McCabe (born 1951), poet
- William Topaz McGonagall (1825–1902), renowned as one of worst poets in the English language
- Thomas M'Crie (1772–1835), Scottish historian, writer and minister of religion
- Candia McWilliam (born 1955), novelist
- Colin McWilliam (1928–1989), architecture academic and author
- John Mein (fl. 18th century), newspaper and almanac publisher and bookseller
- Hugh Miller (1802–1856), writer, geologist, folklorist and evangelical Christian
- Naomi Mitchison (1897–1999), novelist and poet
- Rosalind Mitchison (1919–2002), historian of Scotland specialising in social history
- Alexander Montgomerie (c. 1550 – 1598), Jacobean courtier and makar
- Helen and Morna Mulgray (born 1939), identical twins, authors of crime novels
- Robert Mylne (c. 1643 – 1747), writer of pasquils (lampoons), antiquary and engraver
- Macvey Napier (1776–1847), solicitor, legal scholar and editor of Encyclopædia Britannica
- Mark Napier (1798–1879), lawyer, biographer and historical author
- Charles Neaves, Lord Neaves (1800–1876), advocate, judge, theologian and writer
- Patrick Neill (1776–1851), printer, horticulturalist and naturalist
- John Oswald (c. 1760–1793), philosopher, writer, poet and social critic
- Aileen Paterson (1934–2018), children's author, Maisie Comes to Morningside
- John Playfair (1748–1819), scientist and professor
- Andrew Seth Pringle-Pattison (1856–1931), philosopher
- Finley Quaye (born 1974), singer/songwriter
- Allan Ramsay (1686–1758), poet and father of eponymous painter
- Edward Bannerman Ramsay (1793–1872), clergyman of Scottish Episcopal Church, Dean of Edinburgh, Reminiscences of Scottish Life and Character
- Ian Rankin (born 1960), author of Inspector Rebus crime thrillers, attended University of Edinburgh
- Tessa Ransford, poet and founder of Scottish Poetry Library
- William Robertson (1721–1793), historian, minister of religion and Principal of University of Edinburgh
- Dilys Rose (born 1954), poet
- J. K. Rowling (born 1965), Harry Potter author, wrote first book in Edinburgh coffee-shop, Nicholson's
- Thomas Ruddiman (1674–1757), classical scholar and printer
- Christopher Rush (born 1944), writer and teacher of literature in Edinburgh
- Janet Schaw (c. 1740–1800), travel writer
- Alexander Scott (c. 1520–1582/1583), poet
- Tom Scott (1918–1995), poet
- Sir Walter Scott (1771–1832), novelist, born in Edinburgh
- James Seth (1860–1925), philosopher
- Sara Sheridan (born 1968), novelist, predominately writing historical fiction
- Catherine Sinclair, Victorian novelist and children's author
- William Henry Oliphant Smeaton (1856–1914), writer, journalist, editor, historian and educator
- Alexander Smith (1829–1867), poet, one of the "Spasmodic School"
- Alexander McCall Smith (born 1948), author of The No. 1 Ladies' Detective Agency books and of children's novels, Professor of Medical Law at University of Edinburgh
- Sydney Goodsir Smith (1915–1975), poet
- Sydney Smith (1771–1845), English wit, writer and Anglican cleric, first editor of Edinburgh Review
- Christopher Smout (born 1933), academic, historian, author and Historiographer Royal in Scotland
- Muriel Spark (1918–2006), novelist, author of The Prime of Miss Jean Brodie
- Adam Stark (1784–1867), antiquary
- Robert Louis Stevenson (1850–1894), novelist.
- Dugald Stewart (1753–1828), Scottish Enlightenment philosopher and mathematician
- Matthew Stewart (c. 1717/1719–1785), mathematician and minister of religion
- Annie Shepherd Swan (1859–1943), journalist, novelist and story writer
- James Thomson (1700–1748), poet
- Thomas Thomson (1768–1852), advocate, antiquarian and archivist
- Ruthven Todd (1914–1978), poet, artist, novelist and children's writer
- Nigel Tranter (1909–2000), historical novelist and historian
- William Barclay Turnbull (1811–1863), antiquary
- Alexander Fraser Tytler, Lord Woodhouselee (1747–1813), advocate, judge, write, historian and friend of Robert Burns
- Patrick Fraser Tytler (1791–1849), Scottish historian
- William H C Watson (1931–2005), author, playwright and newspaper editor
- William J. Watson (1865–1948), toponymist, first scholar to place Scottish place-name studies on linguistic basis
- William Montgomery Watt (1909–2006), historian, Emeritus Professor in Arabic and Islamic Studies at University of Edinburgh
- Irvine Welsh (born 1958), novelist, playwright and short story writer, Trainspotting
- Robert Willis (1799–1878), physician, librarian and medical historian
- John Wilson of Ellerey (1785–1854), advocate, literary critic and author
- Sean Michael Wilson (born 1969), graphic novel/comic book writer
- John Philip Wood (died 1838), antiquary and biographer
- Andrew John Young (1885–1971), poet and clergyman

== Medicine, science and engineering ==
- James Ormiston Affleck (1840–1922), physician and medical author
- Alexander Aitken (1895–1967), mathematician
- William Alison (1790–1859), physician, social reformer and philanthropist
- Sir Andrew Balfour (1630–1694), botanist and co-founder of Royal Botanic Garden Edinburgh
- Sir Andrew Balfour (1873–1931), specialist in tropical medicine
- Benjamin Blyth (1819–1866), civil engineer
- Benjamin Blyth II (1849–1917), civil engineer
- Major General William Burney Bannerman (1858–1924), military surgeon
- John Barlow (veterinary scientist) (1815–1856), professor at Royal (Dick) School of Veterinary Studies
- Alexander Graham Bell (1847–1922), telephone pioneer
- Charles Bell (1774–1842), anatomist, surgeon, physiologist and natural theologian
- Max Born (1882–1970), German-British physicist and mathematician
- Sir Thomas Bouch (1822–1880), railway engineer, designer of the original Tay Rail Bridge
- Robert Henry Bow (1827–1909), civil engineer and photographer
- Alexander Crum Brown (1838–1922), organic chemist
- Alexander Buchan (1829–1907), meteorologist, oceanographer and botanist
- Bill Buchanan (computer scientist) OBE, computer scientist
- Eustace Chesser (1902–1973), psychiatrist
- Thomas Clouston (1840–1915), psychiatrist and Superintendent of Royal Edinburgh Asylum
- Fergus I. M. Craik (born 1935), cognitive psychologist, studied at University of Edinburgh
- Sir James Crichton-Browne (1840–1938), psychiatrist and medical psychologist
- Charles Darwin (1809–1882), biologist, studied at University of Edinburgh, On the Origin of Species
- Andrew Duncan (1744–1828), physician and professor at University of Edinburgh
- William Ronald Dodds Fairbairn (1889–1964), psychiatrist and central figure in developing the object relations theory of psychoanalysis
- Sir William Tennant Gairdner (1824–1907), Professor of Medicine in University of Glasgow
- Sir Archibald Geikie (1835–1924), geologist
- James Geikie, (1839–1915), geologist
- James Gregory (1638–1675), mathematician and astronomer
- William Gregory (1803–1858), physician and chemist
- Alexander Henry (rifle maker) (1818–1894), inventor of Henry rifling and barrel of the Martini Henry rifle
- Peter Higgs (1929–2024), theoretical physicist, emeritus professor at University of Edinburgh
- John Hope (1725–1786), physician and botanist, first Regius Keeper of Royal Botanic Garden Edinburgh
- James Hutton, geologist, born in Edinburgh
- Elsie Inglis, doctor and suffragist, founder of maternity hospital for working-class women
- Sophia Jex-Blake, campaigner for medical education for women
- Alexander Keith Johnston (1804–1871), geographer
- Alexander Keith Johnston (1844–1879), geographer and explorer
- James Kennedy (1797–1886), locomotive and marine engineer born in Gilmerton
- Robert Knox, anatomist and purchaser of bodies
- Dr Thomas Latta (1796–1837), pioneer of saline drip
- Arthur Pillans Laurie (1861–1949), chemist and pioneer in scientific analysis of paintings
- Malcolm Laurie (1866–1932), zoologist
- James Lind (1716–1794), physician, pioneer of naval hygiene, developed theory that citrus fruits obviate scurvy
- Joseph Lister (1827–1912), pioneer of antiseptic surgery
- Jessie Macgregor (1863–1906), doctor and among first women to gain a medical degree from University of Edinburgh
- Agnes McLaren (1837–1913), doctor, missionary and first doctor to give medical assistance to women in India
- Colin Maclaurin (1698–1746), mathematician who made contributions to geometry and algebra
- James Clerk Maxwell (1831–1879), physicist
- Alexander Monro primus (1697–1767), founder of Edinburgh Medical School
- Alexander Monro secundus (1733–1817), anatomist, physician and medical educator
- Alexander Monro tertius (1773–1859), surgeon, anatomist and medical educator
- Duncan Napier (1831–1921), Victorian botanist and medical herbalist
- John Napier (1550–1617), mathematician and inventor of logarithms
- James Nasmyth, inventor of steam hammer
- Stan Paterson (1924–2013), glaciologist
- John Paulitious (died 1645), Edinburgh's first plague doctor
- Marion Ross (1903–1994), physicist
- Daniel Rutherford (1749–1819), physician, chemist and botanist, who isolated nitrogen in 1772
- Robert Sibbald (1641–1722), physician, antiquary and co-founder of Royal Botanic Garden Edinburgh
- James Young Simpson (1811–1870), obstetrician who first used chloroform for anaesthesia
- David Skae (1814–1873), specialist physician in psychological medicine
- Frederick William Adolphus Skae, (1842–1881), psychiatrist and health administrator
- Charles Piazzi Smyth (1819–1900), Astronomer Royal for Scotland 1846 to 1888
- Mary Fairfax Somerville (1780–1872), science writer and polymath
- Charles Spalding (1738–1783), improver of diving bell
- Archibald Spencer (1698–1760), associated with Benjamin Franklin and electricity
- Fraser Stoddart (1942–2024), chemist working in the area of supramolecular chemistry and nanotechnology
- Peter Guthrie Tait (1831–1901), mathematical physicist
- D'Arcy Wentworth Thompson (1860–1948), zoologist, mathematician and author of On Growth and Form
- Thomas Stewart Traill (1781–1862), physician, chemist, meteorologist, zoologist
- Professor Ian Wilmut (born 1944), contributor to Dolly the Sheep project, world's first cloned mammal
- Lesley Jane Yellowlees (born 1953), inorganic chemist and first female president of Royal Society of Chemistry

== Military ==
- Sir James Abercrombie, 1st Baronet of Edinburgh (died 1724), British Army officer and politician
- Adam Archibald (1879–1957), recipient of Victoria Cross
- William Bloomfield (1873–1954), recipient of Victoria Cross
- Walter Lorrain Brodie (1885–1918), recipient of Victoria Cross
- William Bruce (1890–1915), recipient of Victoria Cross
- John Cook (1843–1879), recipient of Victoria Cross
- Arthur Edward Cumming (1896–1971), recipient of Victoria Cross
- James Davis (1835–1893), recipient of Victoria Cross
- William Dick-Cunyngham (1851–1900), recipient of Victoria Cross
- Robert Digby-Jones (1876–1900), recipient of Victoria Cross
- James Dundas (1842–1879), recipient of Victoria Cross
- Captain Douglas Ford (1918–1943), recipient of George Cross
- Major John Alexander Fraser (1896–1943), recipient of Military Cross and George Cross
- James Graham, 1st Marquess of Montrose (1612–1650), nobleman and general in Wars of the Three Kingdoms, executed in Edinburgh
- Field Marshal Sir Douglas Haig, 1st Earl Haig (1861–1928), born in Edinburgh
- Captain Alexander Mitchell ("Sandy") Hodge (1916–1997), recipient of Empire Gallantry Medal, later exchanged for George Cross
- William Hope (1834–1909), recipient of Victoria Cross
- William Henry Johnston (1879–1915), recipient of Victoria Cross
- Charles Thomas Kennedy (1873–1907), recipient of Victoria Cross
- Allan Ker (1883–1958), recipient of Victoria Cross
- Alexander Gordon Laing (1793–1826), army major and explorer, first European to reach Timbuktu by north/south route
- John Frederick MacKay (1873–1930), recipient of Victoria Cross
- David Stuart McGregor (1895–1918), recipient of Victoria Cross
- James McPhie (1894–1918), recipient of Victoria Cross
- Gary John O'Donnell (1968–2008), British Army bomb disposal expert awarded George Medal twice
- Captain John Porteous (c. 1695–1736), captain of city guard, lynched during Porteous Riots of 1736
- Henry Ramage (1827–1859), recipient of Victoria Cross
- William Reynolds (1827–1869), recipient of Victoria Cross
- Henry Ritchie (1876–1958), recipient of Victoria Cross
- John Simpson (1826–1884), recipient of Victoria Cross
- Alexander Thompson (1824–1880), recipient of Victoria Cross
- George Wilson (1886–1926), recipient of Victoria Cross
- Mark William Wright (1979–2006), corporal, recipient of George Cross
- David Younger (1871–1900), recipient of Victoria Cross

== Religion ==
- David Laird Adams (1837–1892), academic, professor of Hebrew and oriental languages at University of Edinburgh
- John Baillie (1886–1960), theologian and Church of Scotland minister
- James Bannerman, (1807–1868), Free Church of Scotland theologian
- Jenny Geddes (c. 1600 – c. 1660), market trader, threw stool at Dean of Edinburgh in protest at new prayer book
- Thomas Guthrie (1803–1873), divine and philanthropist, preacher associated with temperance and Ragged Schools
- James Haldane (1768–1851), theologian and missionary
- Thomas Hardy (1747–1798), minister of religion, Moderator of the General Assembly of the Church of Scotland and Professor of Ecclesiastical History at University of Edinburgh
- Alexander Henderson (c. 1583–1646), theologian
- Robert Keith (1681–1757), Episcopal bishop and historian
- John Knox (c. 1513–1572), Protestant reformer, whose John Knox's House is preserved in the High Street
- Robert Murray M'Cheyne (1813–1843), minister in Church of Scotland
- Keith O'Brien (1938–2018), disgraced cardinal
- William Pettigrew (1869–1943), Christian missionary to Tangkhul Naga
- Jane Smeal (1801–1888), Quaker, leading campaigner for abolition of slavery
- John Witherspoon (1723–1794), only clergyman to sign American Declaration of Independence, president of Princeton University

== Royalty ==
- Charles X of France (1757–1836), in Holyrood Palace during his exile
- Henry Stuart, Lord Darnley (1545–1567), King consort of Scotland
- Madeleine of Valois (1520–1537), first spouse of King James V of Scotland
- Saint Margaret of Scotland (c. 1045–1093), wife of King Malcolm III of Scotland
- Mary of Guise (1515–1560), regent of Scotland, and mother of Mary, Queen of Scots
- Mary, Queen of Scots (1542–1587), lived in Holyrood Palace
- Mynyddog Mwynfawr, Brittonic ruler of kingdom of Gododdin in Hen Ogledd (in reading of Y Gododdin accepted by most scholars), perhaps with his court at Din Eidyn

== Scottish Enlightenment ==
- James Anderson of Hermiston (1739–1808), agronomist, lawyer, amateur scientist and economist
- Joseph Black (1728–1799), physicist and first chemist to isolate carbon dioxide
- Hugh Blair (1718–1800), minister of religion and author
- James Boswell (1740–1795), lawyer and biographer of Samuel Johnson
- Thomas Brown (1778–1820), moral philosopher and philosopher of mind; joint holder of Chair of Moral Philosophy at University of Edinburgh
- James Burnett, Lord Monboddo (1714–1799), philosopher, judge and founder of modern comparative historical linguistics
- William Cleghorn (1718–1754), philosopher and holder of Chair of Pneumatics and Moral Philosophy at University of Edinburgh
- John Clerk of Eldin (1728–1812), knight, artist and author of An Essay on Naval Tactics
- Alison Cockburn (1728–1812), poet, wit and socialite
- William Cullen (1710–1790), physician, chemist, early medical researcher and professor at Edinburgh Medical School
- Adam Ferguson (1723–1816), considered founder of sociology
- Sir James Hall, 4th Baronet (1761–1832), geologist and geophysicist
- Henry Home, Lord Kames (1696–1782), philosopher, judge and historian
- David Hume (1711–1776), philosopher, historian and essayist
- James Hutton (1726–1797), founder of modern geology
- Sir John Leslie (1766–1832), mathematician, physicist and investigator of heat
- Thomas Muir of Huntershill (1765–1799), political reformer, leader of Scottish "Friends of the People Society"
- John Playfair (1748–1819), mathematician, "Illustrations of the Huttonian Theory of the Earth"
- William Robertson (1721–1793), one of founders of modern historical research
- Sir John Sinclair, 1st Baronet (1754–1835), politician, writer and first user of the word "statistics" in English
- William Smellie (1740–1795), editor of first edition of Encyclopædia Britannica
- Adam Smith (1723–1790), economist, The Wealth of Nations
- Dugald Stewart (1753–1828), moral philosopher
- John Walker (1730–1803), professor of natural history

== Sports ==
- Neil Alexander (born 1978), football goalkeeper for Hearts
- Alex Arthur (born 1978), professional super featherweight boxer
- Mark Beaumont (born 1983), holds Guinness World Record for "Fastest True Circumnavigation of the World by Bicycle"
- Christophe Berra (born 1985), footballer for Hearts
- Ian Black (born 1985), footballer
- Stewart Bruce (born 1969), cricketer
- Ken Buchanan (born 1945), world lightweight champion boxer (1965)
- Lewis Christie, ice hockey player
- Karteek Clarke, swimmer and ultra distance runner
- Bob Connors, ice hockey player
- Eartha Cumings, football goalkeeper for the Scotland national team
- Simon Danielli (born 1979), international rugby union player
- William Dippie (1907–1997), cricketer
- Jennifer Dodds (born 1991), curler
- George Farm (1924–2004), Scotland, Blackpool and Queen of the South F.C. goalkeeper and Scottish Cup winning manager with Dunfermline Athletic
- Adam Kelso Fulton (1929–1994), international rugby union player
- Charlie Gardiner (1904–1934), ice hockey player
- Craig Gordon (born 1982), football goalkeeper for Celtic and Scotland
- James Alexander Gordon (1936–2014), football results broadcaster
- George Grigor, ice hockey player
- Paul Hampshire (born 1981), professional footballer
- Tony Hand (born 1967), ice hockey player and coach
- Gavin Hastings (born 1962), rugby union captain
- Scott Hastings (born 1964), rugby player and commentator
- Johnny Haynes (1934–2005), England footballer who retired to Edinburgh
- Joe Hendry (born 1988), professional wrestler
- John Horrocks (1816–1881), founder and innovator of modern European fly fishing
- Chris Hoy (born 1976), track cyclist, Olympic Games gold and silver medal winner and 2015 European Le Mans Series winner in the LMP3 class
- Iain Hume, professional footballer
- Andy Irvine (born 1951), international rugby union player
- Hugh Kelsey (1926–1995), international bridge player and writer
- Josh Kerr (born 1997), middle-distance runner
- Lawrence Lovell, ice hockey player
- Alan MacDonald (born 1985), international rugby union player
- Dave Mackay (1934–2015), footballer
- Steven MacLean (born 1982), footballer currently with Hearts
- Ricky Marlowe (born 1950), former professional footballer
- Allan McGregor (born 1982), Scotland footballer
- Michael McIndoe (born 1979), Scotland footballer
- Kenny Miller (born 1979), Scotland footballer
- Bruce Mouat (born 1994), Scotland curler
- Scott Neil, ice hockey player
- Garry O'Connor (born 1983), professional footballer
- Chris Paterson (born 1978), rugby coach
- Jack Pratt, ice hockey player
- Don Revie (1927–1989), footballer and football manager
- Jim Ross, ice hockey player
- Nicholas Ross (born 1947), first-class cricketer
- Gordon Shedden (born 1979), BTCC racing car driver, born in Edinburgh
- Graeme Souness (born 1953), football manager
- Jimmy Spence, ice hockey player
- Gordon Strachan (born 1957), footballer and coach
- Frederick Guthrie Tait (1870–1900), amateur golfer and soldier
- Lee Wallace (born 1987), footballer
- Emma Watson (born 2006), footballer for the Scotland national team
- Doddie Weir (1970–2022), rugby union player
- David Wilkie (born 1954), MBE, Olympic Games and Commonwealth Games champion swimmer
- Archie Craig (1912–2000), endurance cyclist

== Miscellaneous ==
- Sir Edward Stafford (1819–1901), New Zealand politician; served as Prime Minister three times in the latter half of the 1800s
- Sir Andrew Agnew, 7th Baronet (1793–1849), politician and prominent promoter of Sunday Sabbatarianism
- Charles Umpherston Aitchison (1832–1896), Lieutenant-Governor of the Punjab
- Sir Kenneth John Wilson Alexander (1922–2001), economist and university administrator
- Alexander Arbuthnot (died 1585), early printer
- John Bartholomew Sr. (1805–1861), cartographer and engraver
- John Bartholomew Jr. (1831–1893), cartographer
- John George Bartholomew (1860–1920), cartographer and geographer
- John Christopher Bartholomew (1923–2008), cartographer and geographer
- John (Ian) Bartholomew (1890–1962), cartographer and geographer
- Sir Robert Duncan Bell (1878–1953), colonial administrator in India, Acting Governor of Bombay
- Ian Blackford (born 1961), Scottish National Party leader in the UK House of Commons since 2017
- Tony Blair (born 1953), British prime minister 1997–2007
- John Richardson Boyd (1925–2018), milliner based in London
- James Braidwood (1800–1861), founder of world's first municipal fire service in Edinburgh in 1824 and first director of the London Fire Engine Establishment
- Henry Brougham, 1st Baron Brougham and Vaux (1778–1868), statesman, a founder of the Edinburgh Review and Lord Chancellor
- David Brown, first recorded Jew in Edinburgh (1693)
- William Burke and William Hare, serial killers who sold bodies for dissection
- Duncan Cameron, inventor of the Waverley nib pen
- William Chambers (1800–1883), publisher and politician, brother of Robert Chambers
- Archibald Cleghorn (1835–1910), married into royal family of the Kingdom of Hawaii
- James Connolly (1868–1916), Irish republican and socialist leader in the 1916 Easter Rising, executed in Dublin
- Archibald Constable (1774–1827), publisher, bookseller, stationer, and publisher of the Edinburgh Review
- Helen Crummy, community activist and principal founder of Craigmillar Festival Society
- Elaine Davidson, Guinness World Record holder for "Most Pierced Woman"
- Alexander Donaldson, publisher
- James Donaldson, publisher and founder of Donaldson's Hospital
- George Drummond, Lord Provost and supporter of the New Town, Edinburgh
- Helen Duncan (1897–1956), medium and last person imprisoned under the Witchcraft Act 1735
- Henry Dundas, 1st Viscount Melville (1742–1811), Home Secretary and Tory politician
- John Ritchie Findlay (1824–1898), owner of The Scotsman newspaper, philanthropist and donor of the Scottish National Portrait Gallery.
- Thomas Foulis (died 1628), goldsmith and financier
- Lord Fountainhall (1646–1722), jurist
- Sir Patrick Geddes (1854–1932), biologist, sociologist, geographer, philanthropist and town planner
- James Gillespie (1726–1797), snuff-maker and philanthropist
- Robert Gourlay (fl. 1570–1630), merchant
- Alasdair George Hay, first and current chief fire officer of the Scottish Fire and Rescue Service
- George Heriot, goldsmith and philanthropist
- Alexander Hunter (1729–1809), physician, writer and editor
- Sir John Ritchie Inch (1911–1993), police officer, Chief Constable of Edinburgh City Police
- Archibald Johnston, Lord Warriston (1611–1663), judge, statesman
- Sir Duncan Alexander Johnston (1847–1931), Royal Engineers officer, Director General of the Ordnance Survey, and first-class cricketer
- Robert Jousie (died 1626), merchant and courtier
- Mary King fl. 1629, Burgess of Edinburgh and namesake of Mary King's Close
- David Laing (1793–1878), antiquary and editor
- Simon Somerville Laurie (1829–1909), educator
- Lily Laverock (1880–1969), journalist, impresario and suffragist
- John Law (c. 1671–1729), economist, Controller General of Finances under Louis XV of France
- James Lorimer (1818–1890), advocate and father of Robert and James Henry
- Flora Macaulay, editor of The Oban Times newspaper
- John Mackintosh (1929–1978), Scottish Labour Party politician and Edinburgh University lecturer
- John MacMorran (died 1595), Scottish merchant killed by High School students
- Mary Cranston Mason (1846–1932), social reformer and temperance leader
- William McEwan (1827–1913), politician and brewer who funded construction of the McEwan Hall at University of Edinburgh
- Duncan McLaren (1800–1886), politician and political writer, Lord Provost and MP
- John McLaren, Lord McLaren (1831–1910), politician, Lord Advocate and judge
- Priscilla Bright McLaren (1815–1906), abolitionist and suffragist, President of Edinburgh Women's Suffrage Society
- James McLevy (1796–1875), detective and author of popular crime mysteries
- Sir David Monro (1813–1877), New Zealand politician, Speaker of New Zealand House of Representatives
- Alice Morrison (born 1963), adventurer and explorer
- Angus Morrison QC, Mayor of Toronto
- James Pillans (1778–1864), classical scholar and educational reformer
- John Ritchie (1778–1870), co-founder and later sole owner of The Scotsman newspaper
- George Small (1782–1861), partner in piano manufacturing firm of Muir, Wood and Company, magistrate and philanthropist
- D. Alan Stevenson (1891–1971), philatelist and architect
- Jock Stewart (1918–1989), executioner
- John Guthrie Tait (1861–1945), educator and rugby internationalist
- Sir Charles Tupper, one of the Fathers of the Confederation forming the Dominion of Canada in 1867 and later sixth Prime Minister of Canada
- James Tytler (1745–1804), apothecary, editor of second edition of Encyclopædia Britannica and first person in Britain to fly, in a hot air balloon)
- Andrew Usher (1826–1898), whisky distiller and blender, gifted the Usher Hall to Edinburgh
- Eliza Wigham (1820–1899), abolitionist and women's rights campaigner

== See also ==
- List of Scots
