= Anne Ross Cousin =

British poet, musician and songwriter (1824–1906)

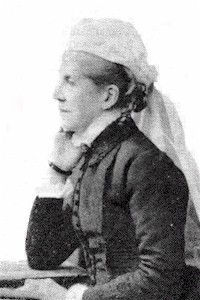
- Born: 27 April 1824; Hull, England
- Died: 6 December 1906 (aged 82); Edinburgh, Scotland
- Occupations: Musician and songwriter
- Known for: Author of several popular hymns in Great Britain during the mid-to late 19th century
- Spouse: William Cousin (1847–1883)
- Children: 6 children

Anne Ross Cousin (née Cundell; 27 April 1824 – 6 December 1906) was a British poet, musician and songwriter. She was a student of John Muir Wood and later became a popular writer of hymns, most especially "The Sands of Time Are Sinking", while travelling with her minister husband from 1854 to 1878. Many of her hymns were widely used throughout Great Britain during the mid-to late 19th century. One of her sons, John William Cousin, was a prominent writer and editor of A Short Biographical Dictionary of English Literature.

== Biography ==
Anne Ross Cousin was born in Hull, England on 27 April 1824. She was the only child of Dr. David Ross Cundell, a former assistant surgeon with the 33rd regiment at the Battle of Waterloo, and moved with her family to Leith soon after her birth. She received a private education and became a skilled pianist under John Muir Wood. In 1847, she married William Cousin, a minister of the Free Church of Scotland, then serving at a local Presbyterian church in Chelsea, and with whom she had six children. Shortly after their marriage, William was called to minister to the Free Church in Irvine, North Ayrshire, and then in Melrose in 1859. During this time, Anne began writing church hymns for her husband's services and many of these became very popular in Britain during the mid-to late 19th century.

Her most popular song, "The Sands of Time Are Sinking", was written in 1854 while William was still in Irvine. Cousin later claimed she had been inspired by the writing of Samuel Rutherford. The original version was 19 stanzas and first appeared in "The Christian Treasury" as "The Last Words of Samuel Rutherford" in 1857. It did not become widely known, however, until the Rev. Dr. J. Hood Wilson introduced a shorted 5-verse version into a hymn book, "The Service of Praise", for his congregation at the Barclay Church in Edinburgh. Other popular ones included "O Christ what burdens bowed Thy head" and "King Eternal King Immortal", the latter often set to music and sung at choral festivals. A collection of her poems, Immanuel's Land and Other Pieces, was published in 1876 under her initials A.R.C., by which she was most widely known.

They retired in Edinburgh after nearly 20 years of religious service. William Cousin died in 1883, and Anne remained in the city until her own death on 6 December 1906. Her daughter, Anne P. Cousin, contributed to her biography when she was profiled for the Dictionary of National Biography by Sir Sidney Lee in 1912.

== The Sands of Time are Sinking ==
Cousin's best known hymn, "The Sands of Time are Sinking", is known and sung over the English-speaking world. It is also known as "Immanuel's Land", the phrase that is repeated at the end of each stanza. This poem was inspired by Samuel Rutherford's last words. It was first published in the 1860s, with extracts from Rutherford's works, under the title: Last words of Reverend Samuel Rutherford: with some of his sweet sayings.

The first verse of Immanuel's Land says:

The sands of time are sinking, the dawn of Heaven breaks;
The summer morn I’ve sighed for – the fair, sweet morn awakes:
Dark, dark hath been the midnight, but dayspring is at hand,
And glory, glory dwelleth in Immanuel’s land.

In this context, Immanuel is used as a name of Christ. The original poem has nineteen verses, but only a few of them appear in most hymnals. Many of the omitted verses are about Anwoth, where Rutherford lived.

== See also ==
- Anwoth
