= Muir, Wood and Company =

Scottish piano manufacturer

Muir, Wood and Company was the premier Scottish piano manufacturer in the early 19th century.

== History ==
In 1798, after the failure of his brother's retail music business, John Muir took over management of the firm and entered into a partnership with Andrew Wood to form the piano manufacturing and music publishing firm of Muir, Wood and Company.

In 1799 the company won a royal warrant as the "Musical Instrument Makers of His Majesty." The firm at this time was located at 16 George Street in Edinburgh, Scotland.

In 1804, George Small joined the firm to run the retail end of the business. The company also relocated at this time to 7 Leith Street in Edinburgh, with that location being renumbered to 13 Leith Street in 1811.

The firm's manufacturing facility was located at Calton Hill. In addition to pianos, the firm made organs (church, chamber and barrel), harps, violins, cellos, tambourines, triangles, drums and serpents.

The firm continued until John Muir's death in 1818. Andrew Wood and George Small continued in business, but on a reduced scale, under the name Wood, Small and Company, until Andrew Wood's death in 1829. In 1822, the firm moved to Waterloo Place, Edinburgh.

Successive companies were Wood and Company, J. Muir Wood and Company, and Small, Bruce and Company.
