= Janet Schaw =

Scottish writer (c. 1740–1800)

- Born: c. 1740; Lauristone, Scotland
- Died: December 1800 (aged 59–60); Plymouth, England
- Burial place: Eggbuckland
- Occupation: Writer
- Parents: Gideon Schaw (father); Anne Rutherfurd (mother)
- Relatives: Robert Schaw (brother); Alexander Schaw (brother)

Janet Schaw (c. 1740 – December 1800) was a Scottish writer, known for letters detailing her travels to the West Indies, North Carolina, and Portugal in the 1770s.

== Early life ==
Janet Schaw was born about 1740 in Lauristone (also spelled "Lauriston"), a 14 acre (5.7 ha) farm just outside Edinburgh, Scotland, to Gideon and Anne (née Rutherfurd) Schaw. Little is known of Schaw's early life, but she had at least two brothers. The elder brother, Robert, was lost to her from childhood when he travelled at a young age to the American colonies, and the younger, Alexander (also known as Sandie), accompanied her on her eventual voyage to those colonies. Their parents, Gideon Schaw of Lauriston, the Register of Tobacco in Edinburgh, and Anne Rutherfurd of Bowland, married in Edinburgh in 1723. However, upon Gideon's death in 1772, his affairs were such that Alexander had to sell the Lauriston estate. Janet Schaw would have lived in Edinburgh at the time of the Edinburgh Enlightenment.

== Letters ==
In 1774–1776, she sailed from Burntisland in Fife board The Jamaica Packet to St. Kitts and Antigua, in the West Indies, then to North Carolina, returning to Edinburgh via Portugal in 1776. She wrote letters during Schaw travels that were discovered in the British Museum in 1904 and published as Journal of a Lady of Quality Being the Narrative of a Journey from Scotland to the West Indies, North Carolina and Portugal in the Years 1774 -1776. On her travels she would experience storms at sea off Fair Isle, compare the slave-laboured sugar plantations to the improving East Lothian farms, witness the onset of the American Revolution in Cape Fear, and its effects on her family and friends, and marvel at the Christmas pageantry and processions in Portugal.

The Journal records Schaw's travels during 1774 - 1776 in a series of letters. In her first letter of 9pm 25 October 1774 she says "I propose writing every day, but you must not expect a regular journal. I will not fail to write whatever can amuse myself and whether you find it entertaining or not, I know you will refuse it a reading. As every subject will be guided by my own immediate feelings my opinions and descriptions will depend on the health and humour of the moment in which I write; from which cause my sentiments will often appear to differ on the same subject."

On her journeys she was accompanied by her brother Alexander Schaw, three adolescents, Fanny (18) John (11) and William (Billie) Rutherfurd (9), as well as Mrs. Mary Miller, her abigail, and a manservant, Robert. The three youngsters were the children of John Rutherfurd of Bowland, Midlothian (the Edgerston branch of the Rutherfurds) who was a plantation owner and former Customs official living in Wilmington. The children were returning to their father. Alexander was due to take up an appointment as Customs Officer on St. Kitts. Schaw also visited her other brother Robert at his plantation, Schawfield, located a few miles from Wilmington on the Cape Fear River. The Rutherfurd children had recently inherited a plantation. On her journey, Schaw would meet prominent West Indian families and Scots.

Schaw had planned to remain in North Carolina with Fanny, but the American Revolution frustrated these plans. Her brother would not take up his post in St. Kitts. Instead he went off "quietly on board the Scorpion Man of War to Boston" and then to London, carrying despatches from North Carolina Governor Josiah Martin to Lord Dartmouth informing him of the situation in North Carolina. Schaw returned to Edinburgh via Portugal with Fanny, John and Billie. The boys were sent to England to be educated under the care of Lord Townshend. Fanny married Archbald Menzies, shortly after their arrival home in October 1776.

The journal was discovered in 1904 during a search for other material in the British Library, where it was catalogued as Egerton 2423. The manuscript had no name on it and it was "only after much following of clues and searching in the records of England, Scotland, Ireland, the West Indies and America [that] the editors [have] been able to trace the careers of those who play the leading parts in the story.' A further two copies of the manuscript have since been found. One, owned by the Antiguan historian, Vere Langford Oliver, contained a dedication to Alexander Schaw Esq., "the Brother, friend and fellow traveler of the Author, his truly affect. Jen. Schaw, St. Andrew's Square, March 10, 1778." This helped to identify the author. The third manuscript had been passed down through the Schaw family and was owned by Colonel Vetch, a descendant of Schaw's grandfather. Vetch was able to provide further genealogical information which appeared as a family tree in the 1939 edition. The North Carolina Collection at the University of North Carolina at Chapel Hill holds a contemporary manuscript copy.

The journal has been reviewed in a number of academic books: it contains a personal account of Colonial America and Empire on the brink of the American Revolution.

The journal is eminently readable, at times gripping, with a distinctive narrative voice' and 'is an especially instructive example of the way aesthetics lent itself to knitting together categories of social denomination.

The journal is clearly "a private document" and takes the form of a letter. But for whom it was written is a point of conjecture. Schaw's statement that "At whatever time we meet, I am certain we will meet with unabated regards" has led to conjecture that it was written to someone who was "much more like a lover left behind than a friend."

We should celebrate Schaw's ability to bring that world to life, her incisiveness in noting the rituals and drama and details of the societies she encountered, and her relating even those things that she could not 'see' so clearly from her vantage point.

== Later life ==
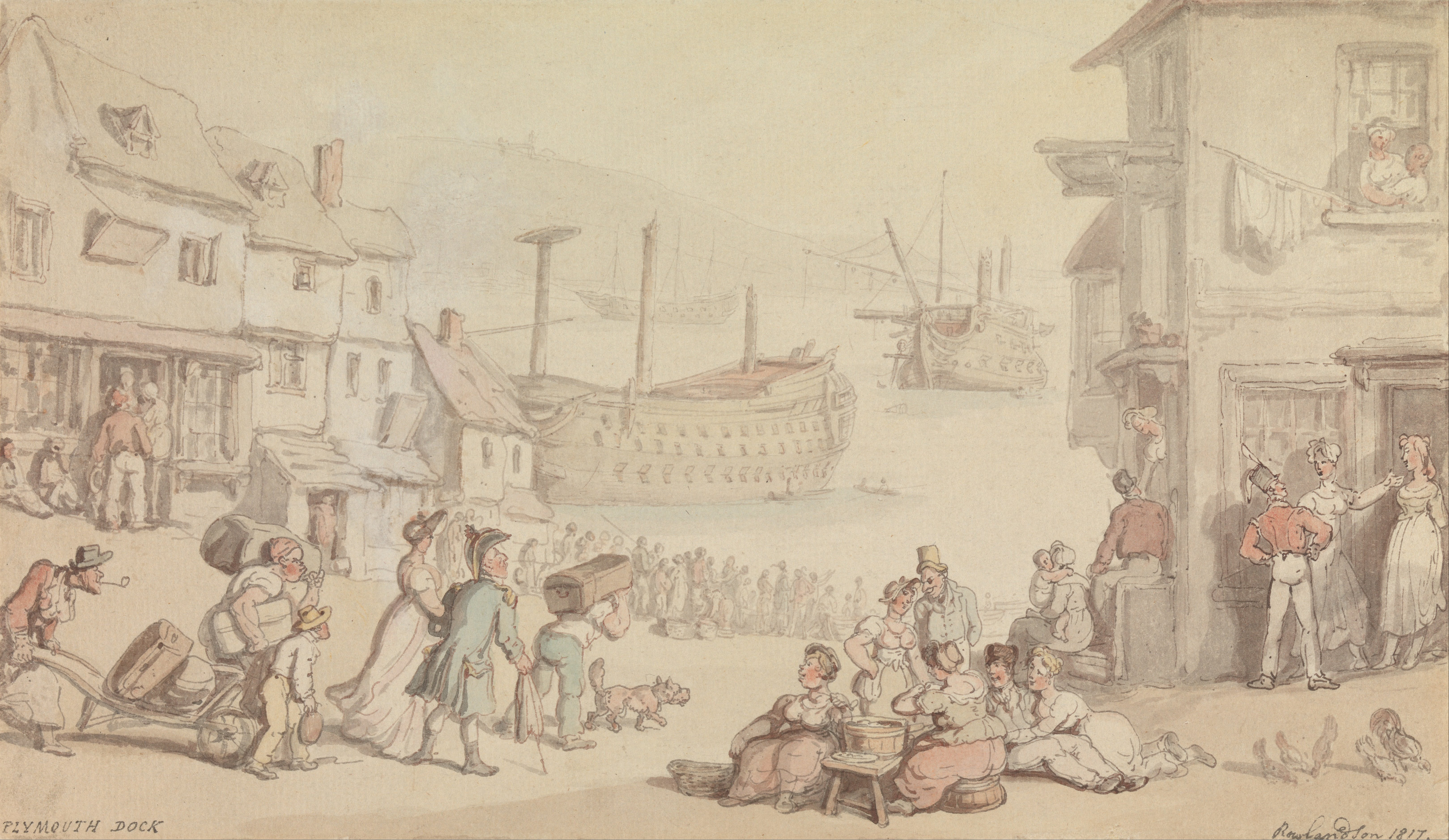
Plymouth Dock by Thomas Rowlandson, 1817

Schaw returned to Edinburgh, living in the New Town. Fanny's husband would die and on 30 April 1787 at St Martin in the Fields, London, Fanny married Janet Schaw's brother, Alexander Schaw. Alexander Schaw was appointed as Storekeeper at the Gun Wharf in the Royal Dockyards at Plymouth Dock. Janet Schaw lived with Alexander and Fanny in the Officer's barracks there. In 1789 George III and Queen Charlotte visited the Royal Dockyards to review the Fleet and the Dockyards. On Monday 17 August, they visited the Dockyard where they were met 'by a great number of naval and military officers." According to Mrs W. H. Nelson, a descendant of the Rutherfurds, the King and Queen, "had lunch with Mr. and Mrs. Alexander Schaw and Miss Janet Schaw. There was a good view of the shipping to be had from their balcony and when, after lunch, Queen Charlotte, went out to look at it, Miss Janet Schaw spread a very beautiful shawl over the balcony railing for the queen to lean on. Afterward this shawl was put away as a relic and eventually went to New Zealand with members of the Schaw family who settled there."

Janet Schaw wrote her will on 14 March 1792 describing herself as a spinster. She may have been worried about her health when she wrote her will as the Bath Chronicle and Weekly Gazette records a Mr. and Miss Schaw arriving in Bath in its 29 March 1792 issue. She was buried on 21 December 1800 in Eggbuckland, Plymouth, England.

== See also ==
- List of people from Edinburgh
- List of Scottish writers
