= John William Cousin =

Scottish writer and editor

John W. Cousin
- Born: John William Cousin; 1849; Scotland
- Died: December 1910 (aged 60–61); United Kingdom
- Occupations: Writer, editor
- Writing career
- Pen name: John W. Cousin, J.W. Cousin
- Genres: Non-fiction, biographies, encyclopedias, literary criticism
- Notable work: A Short Biographical Dictionary of English Literature

John William Cousin (1849–1910) was a British writer, editor and biographer. He was one of six children born to William and Anne Ross Cousin, his mother being a noted hymn-writer, in Scotland. A fellow of the Faculty of Actuaries and secretary of the Actuarial Society of Edinburgh, he revised and wrote the introduction for Henry Wadsworth Longfellow's Evangeline in 1907.

However, he is best known as the editor of A Short Biographical Dictionary of English Literature, a collection of biographical entries on numerous authors and literary figures, originally published in 1910 for J.M. Dent's "Everyman's Library" series. The bulk of his work was later used by David Clayton Browning to compile the Everyman's Dictionary of Literary Biography which was released in 1958, and subsequently reprinted during the 1960s and 1970s.

== Bibliography ==
- Evangeline (1907, originally written by Henry Wadsworth Longfellow)
- A Short Biographical Dictionary of English Literature (1910)
