= Andrew Seth Pringle-Pattison =

British philosopher

Andrew Seth Pringle-Pattison FBA
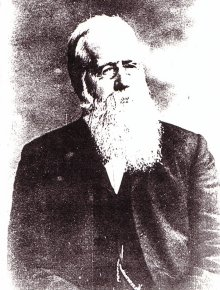
- Born: Andrew Seth; 20 December 1856; Edinburgh, Scotland
- Died: 1 September 1931 (aged 74); The Haining, Selkirkshire, Scotland
- Spouse: Eva Stropp (m. 1884; died 1928)
- Children: 5
- Relatives: James Seth (brother)

Education
- Education: University of Edinburgh; Humboldt University of Berlin; University of Göttingen; University of Jena

Philosophical work
- Era: 19th-/20th-century philosophy
- Region: Western philosophy
- School: Personal idealism Panentheism
- Institutions: University College of Cardiff; University of St Andrews; University of Edinburgh
- Main interests: Metaphysics, philosophical ogic, philosophy of religion
- Notable ideas: Defence of personality against absolute idealism, necessity of anthropomorphism in thought

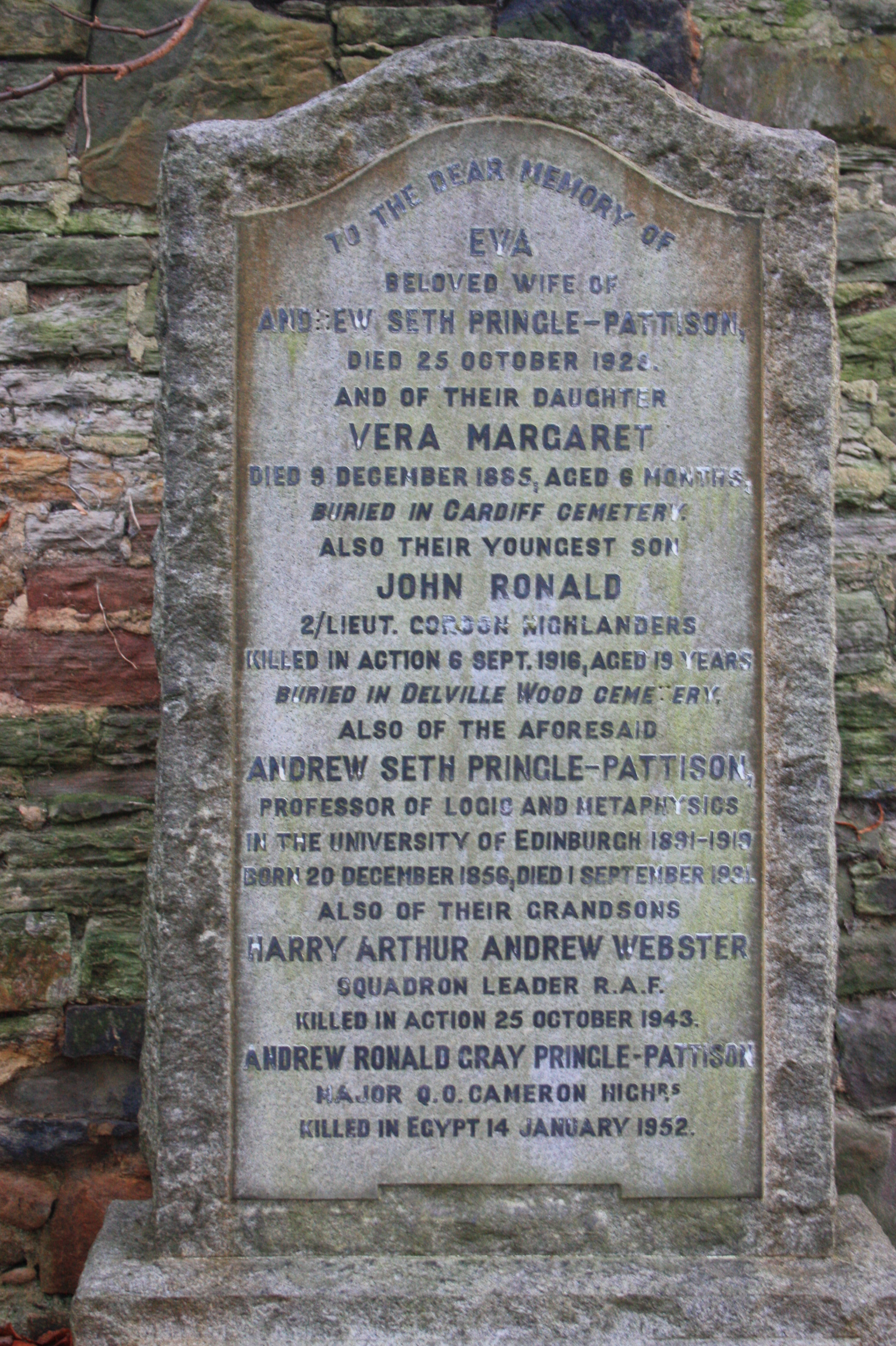
The Pringle-Pattison grave, Morningside Cemetery, Edinburgh

Andrew Seth, FBA (1856–1931), who changed his name to Andrew Seth Pringle-Pattison in 1898 to fulfill the terms of a bequest, was a Scottish philosopher. His brother was James Seth, also a philosopher.

== Early life and education ==
Their father, Smith Kinmont Seth, was the son of a farmer from Fife and a bank clerk in the head office of the Commercial Bank of Scotland. Their mother, Margaret, was the daughter of Andrew Little a farmer from Berwickshire. An elder brother died in infancy.

Seth was educated at High School and the University of Edinburgh. In 1878 he was awarded a Hibbert Travelling Fellowship. He spent two years abroad, chiefly at German universities. On his return in 1880 he was appointed assistant to Professor Campbell Fraser, Professor of Logic and Metaphysics at Edinburgh. He became Balfour Lecturer in Philosophy in 1883. From 1883 to 1887 he was Professor of Logic and Philosophy at the newly created University College of Cardiff. He returned to Scotland in 1887 when he was appointed Professor of Logic, Rhetoric and Metaphysics at St Andrews (1887–91). He was Gifford Lecturer, University of Aberdeen, 1911–13, Hibbert Lecturer (1921) and Gifford Lecturer, University of Edinburgh (1921–23).

Pringle-Pattison received the degree Doctor of Civil Law (DCL) honoris causa from the University of Durham in June 1902.

== Personal life ==
In 1884 he married Eva (d. 1928), daughter of Albrecht Stropp. The couple had two daughters and three sons

He is buried with his wife and family in Morningside Cemetery, Edinburgh against the south wall towards the south-west.

== Philosophical work ==
Seth's twin enemies were English Empiricism and the Anglo variant of Hegelianism. According to Seth, both manner of philosophy degraded the independence of the individual. "Each self," he wrote in Hegelianism and Personality, "is a unique existence, which is perfectly impervious ... to other selves – impervious in a fashion of which the impenetrability of matter is a faint analogue." Seth's comments here stand in stark contrast to the British and American Hegelianism of the turn of the 20th century.

Seth was a personal idealist and was critical of Absolute idealism, according to Seth personality should not be merged into the Absolute. Seth's views have also been described as panentheistic.

It was F. H. Bradley's and Josiah Royce's primary contention that the Self is permeable to all manner of imitation, and that the self as Seth describes is a harmful fiction. At the heart of Seth's analysis was a defence of the necessity of anthropomorphism, John Ruskin's "pathetic fallacy." "We are anthropomorphic," he affirmed, "and necessarily so, to the inmost fibre of our thinking." He continues: "Every category ... every description of existence or relation, is necessarily a transcript from our own nature and our own experience. Into some of our conceptions we put more, into others less, of ourselves; but all modes of existence and forms of action are necessarily construed by us in terms of our own life. Everything, down to the atom, is constructed upon the scheme of the conscious self, with its multiplicity of states and its central interpenetrating unity. We cannot rid our thought of its inevitable presupposition." Personality, the true a priori, stands walled off against external phenomenon either in terms of the Absolute, or from the influx of sensation. Seth's defence of personality had a dramatic effect on later, anti-Hegelian and pluralist, thinkers in the United States in particular. William James, George Santayana, Bertrand Russell and George Herbert Mead, all borrowed his concept of the personality, or psyche, and sought it as a barrier against the claims of Gabriel Tarde, F. H. Bradley, and Josiah Royce.

== Works ==
- Essays in Philosophical Criticism edited with R B Haldane in memory of T H Green (1883)
- Hegelianism and Personality (1887)
- Scottish philosophy a comparison of the Scottish and German answers to Hume (second edition 1890)
- Man's Place in the Cosmos and other essays (1897)
- The Philosophical Radicals and Other Essays, with chapters reprinted on the philosophy of religion in Kant and Hegel (1907)
- The Idea of God in the light of Recent Philosophy Gifford Lectures(1917)
- The Idea of Immortality Gifford Lectures (1922)
- Studies in the Philosophy of Religion (1930)
- The Balfour Lectures on Realism edited with a Memoir of the Author by G F Barbour (1933)
