= James Maidment =

British antiquary and collector

James Maidment (1793 in London – 1879 in Edinburgh) was a British antiquary and collector. He passed through Edinburgh University to the Scottish bar, and was chief authority on genealogical cases.

Maidment's hobby was the collection of literary rarities. He edited and published editions of ancient literary remains including A Book of Scottish Pasquils, 1568-1715, a selection from the papers of the family of Boyd of Kilmarnock from the 16th and 17th centuries, state papers and miscellaneous correspondence of Thomas, Baron Melros (from the 17th century), letters and state papers during the reign of King James the Sixth, chiefly from the manuscript collections of Sir James Balfour of Denmylne, constitutions, charters etc. of the nunnery of Sciennes, 1512–88, and Scottish Ballads and Songs: Historical and Traditionary.

Maidment was also a poet and a friend of Sir Walter Scott. A collection of his poems is held at the Kenneth Spencer Research Library at the University of Kansas.

== Life ==
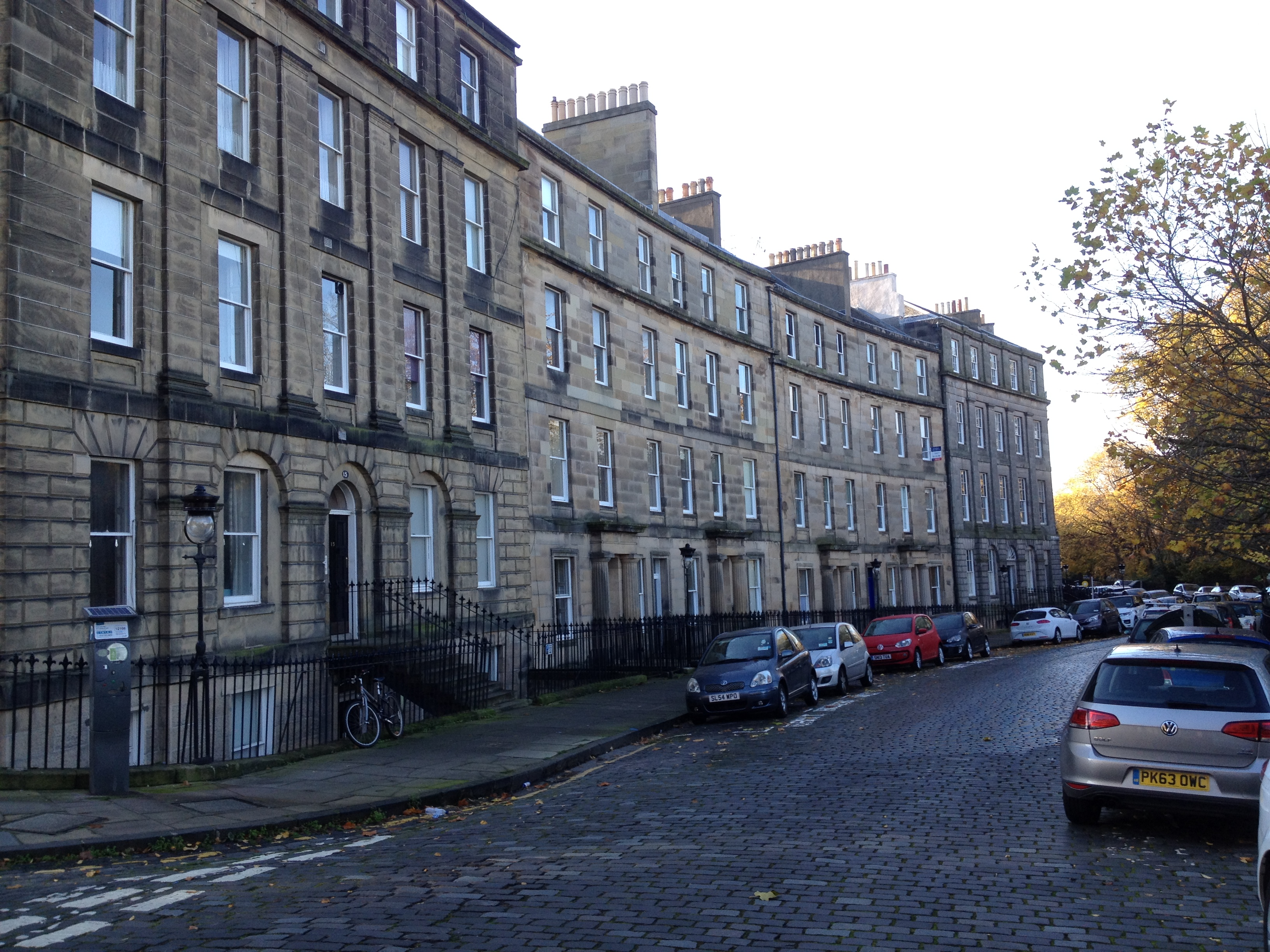
Royal Crescent 15–23, Edinburgh

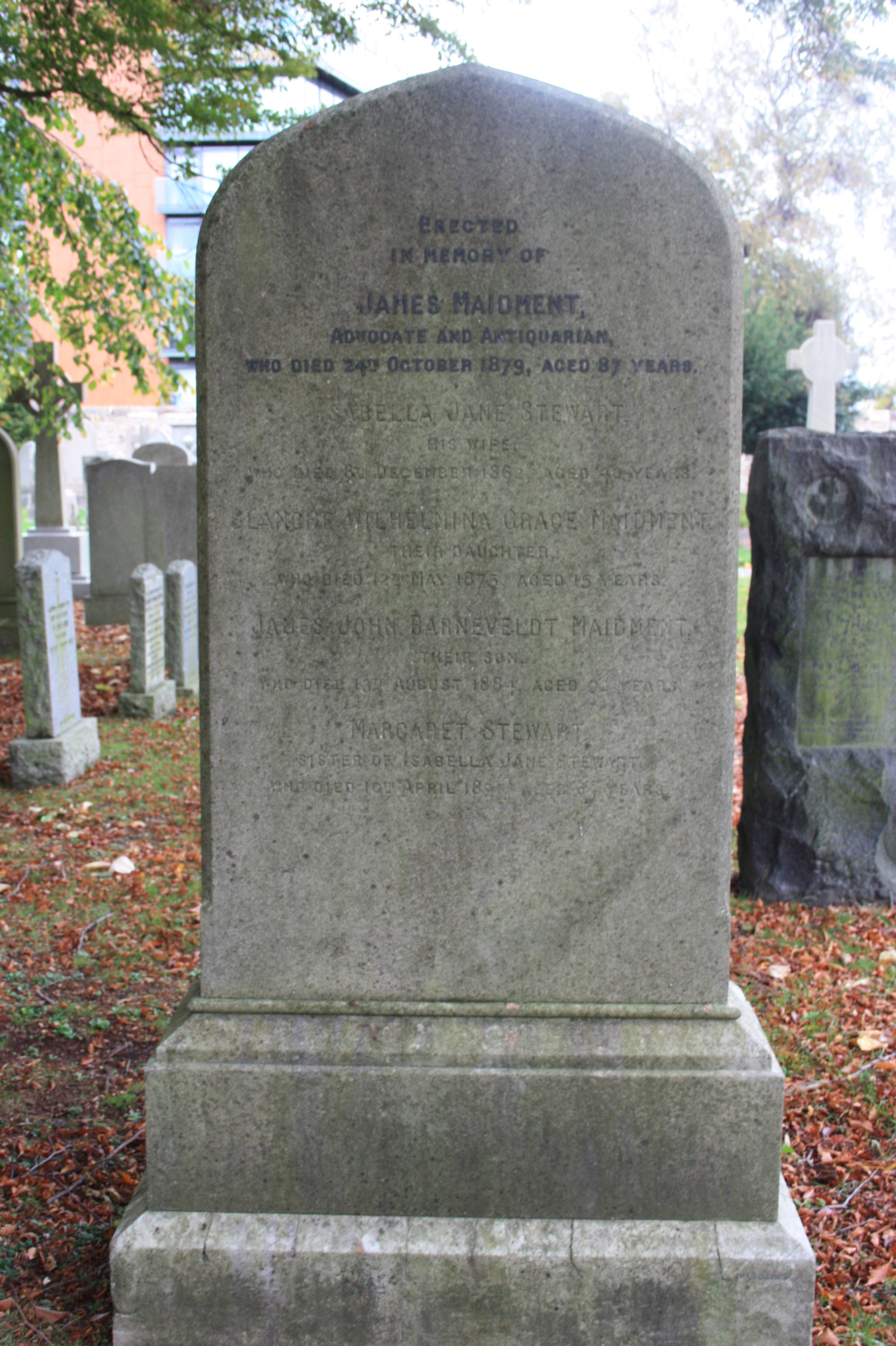
The grave of James Maidment, Dean Cemetery, Edinburgh

He was born in London about 1795; his father was a solicitor. Called to the Scottish bar in 1817, he soon took a high position as an advocate in cases involving genealogical inquiry, and was much involved in disputed peerage cases. In 1832 he lived at 103 Princes Street looking onto Edinburgh Castle. He moved soon after to 10 Forres Street on the Moray Estate in west Edinburgh. He later lived at 25 Royal Crescent on the northern edge of the Second New Town in Edinburgh.

He died in Edinburgh, 24 October 1879, and was buried with his family in the Dean Cemetery. The grave lies in the first northern extension.

He was an extensive collector, and the sale, in May 1880, of his library occupied fifteen days.

== Family ==
He was married to Isabella Jane Stewart (1822-1862). They had several children before she died aged only 40.

== Works ==
Maidment showed an early taste for antiquarian and historical research, and he became friends with Sir Walter Scott, Charles Kirkpatrick Sharpe, and other men of letters. His publications were very numerous, though many were anonymous, and several were privately printed in small editions. He published generally with John Stevenson and his son Thomas George Stevenson. He edited works for the Bannatyne, Maitland, Abbotsford, and Hunterian Clubs, and for the Spottiswoode Society; and he was the main editor of John Kay's Edinburgh Portraits, 2 vols. 1837. One of his major works is the Dramatists of the Restoration,’ 14 vols. Edinburgh, 1877, in the editorship of which he was assisted by William Hugh Logan.

Other compilations of Maidment's were:

- Nugæ Derelictæ: Documents illustrative of Scottish Affairs, 1206–1715, with Robert Pitcairn, 1822.
- Reliquiæ Scoticæ: Scottish Remains in Prose and Verse, from Original MSS. and Scarce Tracts, 1828.
- Letters from Bishop Percy, John Callander of Craigforth, David Herd, and others, to George Paton (late of the Custom House, Edinburgh), with an Appendix of Illustrative Matter, Biographical Notices, &c., 1830.
- Historical Fragments relative to Scotish Affairs from 1635 to 1664, 1832–3.
- The Argyle Papers, from the manuscripts of Robert Mylne, 1834.
- Galatians: an Ancient Mystery, 1835, taken down from the recitations of the Guisards at Stirling about 1815.
- Fragmenta Scoto-Dramatica, 1715–1758, from Original Manuscripts and other Sources, 1835.
- Bannatyniana: Notices relative to the Bannatyne Club, instituted in February M.DCCC.XXIII.; including Critiques on some of its Publications; with a curious Prefatory Notice, including Letters to and from Sir Walter Scott, Notes, &c., 1836.
- Analecta Scotica: Collections illustrative of the Civil, Ecclesiastical, and Literary History of Scotland, chiefly from Original Manuscripts, 2 vols. 1834–7.
- Roxburgh Revels, and other relative Papers; including Answers to the Attack on the Memory of the late Joseph Haslewood, with Specimens of his Literary Productions, 1837.
- Court of Session Garland: with an Appendix, 1839.
- Scottish Elegiac Verses on the Principal Nobility and Gentry, from 1629 to 1729, with interesting Biographical Notices, Notes, and an Appendix of illustrative Papers, 1842.
- The Spottiswoode Miscellany: a Collection of Original Papers and Tracts, illustrative chiefly of the Civil and Ecclesiastical History of Scotland, with Biographical Notices and Notes, 2 vols. 1844–5.
- Genealogical Fragments, 1855.
- Scottish Ballads and Songs, with illustrative Notes, &c., 1859.
- A Book of Scottish Pasquils, 1568–1715, edited with Introductory and Prefatory Remarks, 1868.
- A Packet of Pestilent Pasquils, a supplement to the Book of Scottish Pasquils, privately printed, 1868.

His publisher, Thomas George Stevenson, compiled a bibliography of his works, Bibliography of James Maidment, Esq., advocate, Edinburgh; From the year M.DCCC.XVII to M.DCCC.LXXVIII. Edinburgh: Printed for private circulation, 1883 (A new ed. of his "Bibliographical list of the various publications by James Maidment ... 1817-1859." Edinburgh, 1859.)
