= Plague doctor =

17th-century physician who treated patients with bubonic plague

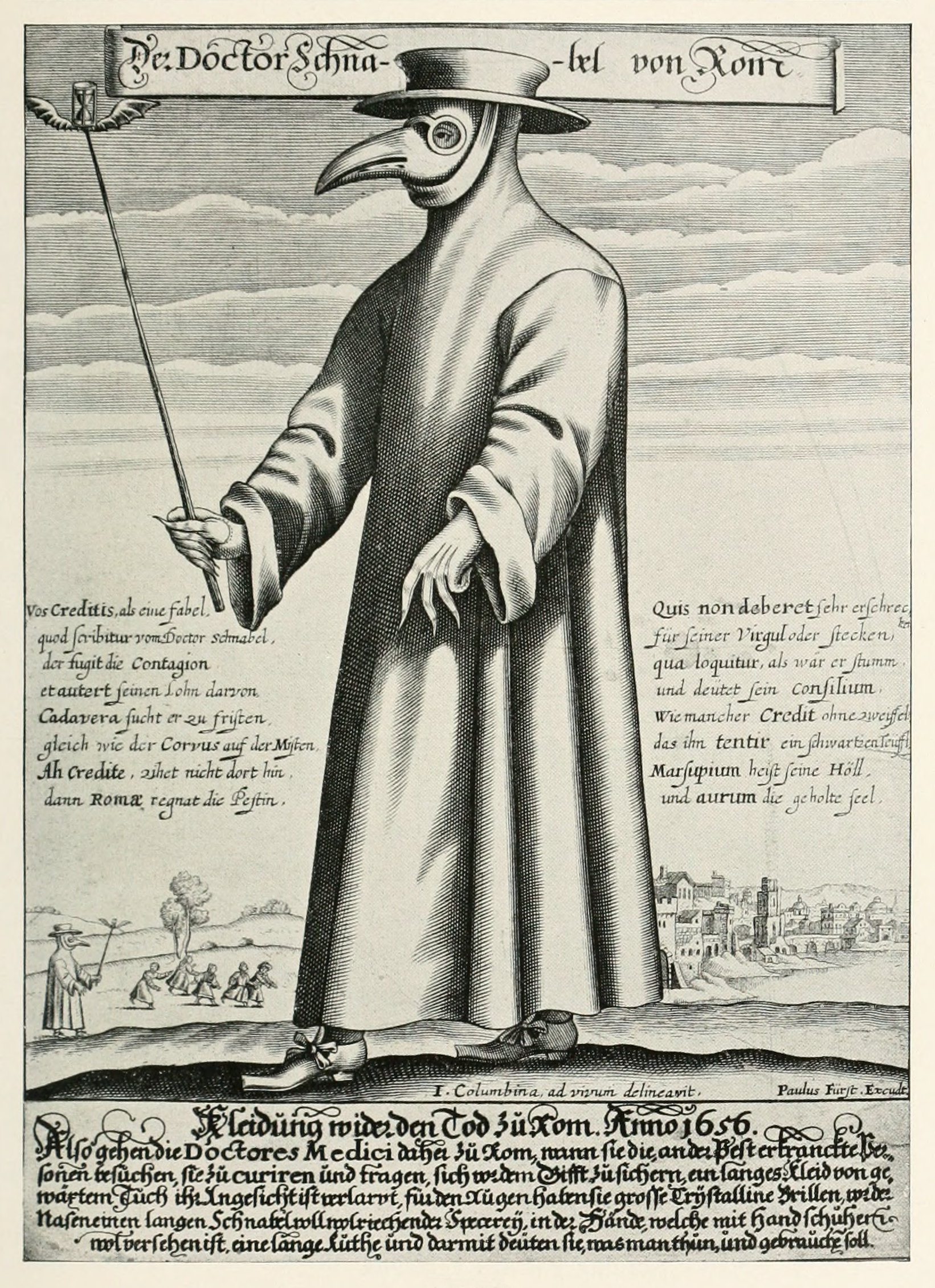
Satirical Copper engraving of a plague doctor of 17th-century Rome, by Paulus Fürst, 1656.

A plague doctor was a type of physician who treated victims of plague during epidemics in 17th-century Europe. These physicians were hired by the affected cities to treat infected patients regardless of income, especially the poor, who could not afford to pay.

Plague doctors had a mixed reputation, with some citizens seeing their presence as a warning to leave the area or that death was near. Some plague doctors were said to charge patients and their families additional fees for special treatments or false cures. In many cases, these doctors were not experienced or trained physicians or surgeons; instead they were volunteers, second-rate doctors, or young doctors just starting a career. Plague doctors rarely cured patients, instead serving to record death tolls and the number of infected people for demographic purposes.

In France and the Netherlands, plague doctors often lacked medical training and were referred to as "empirics". Plague doctors were known as municipal or "community plague doctors", whereas "general practitioners" were separate doctors and both might be in the same city or town simultaneously.

== History ==
According to Michel Tibayrunc's Encyclopedia of Infectious Diseases, the first mention of the iconic plague doctor is found during a 1619 plague outbreak in Paris, in a biography of royal physician Charles de Lorme, serving King Louis XIII of France at the time. After De Lorme, German engraver Gerhart Altzenbach published a famous illustration in 1656, which publisher Paulus Fürst's iconic Doctor Schnabel von Rom (1656) is based upon. In this satirical work, Fürst describes how the doctor frightens people and swindles the dead and dying.

The city of Orvieto hired Matteo Angelo as a plague doctor in 1348 for four times a normal doctor's rate of 50 florins per year. Pope Clement VI hired several extra plague doctors during the Black Death plague to tend to the sick people of Avignon. Of 18 doctors in Venice, only one was left by 1348: five had died of the plague, and 12 were missing and may have fled.

== Methods and tasks ==
Plague doctors practiced bloodletting and other remedies such as placing frogs or leeches on the buboes to "rebalance the humors." A plague doctor's principal task, besides treating people suffering from the plague, was to compile public records of plague deaths. In certain European cities like Florence and Perugia, plague doctors were requested to do autopsies to help determine the cause of death and how the plague affected the people. Plague doctors sometimes took patients' last will and testament during times of plague epidemics, and gave advice to their patients about their conduct before death. This advice differed per patient, and after the Middle Ages, the nature of the relationship between doctor and patient was governed by an increasingly complex ethical code.

== Costume ==
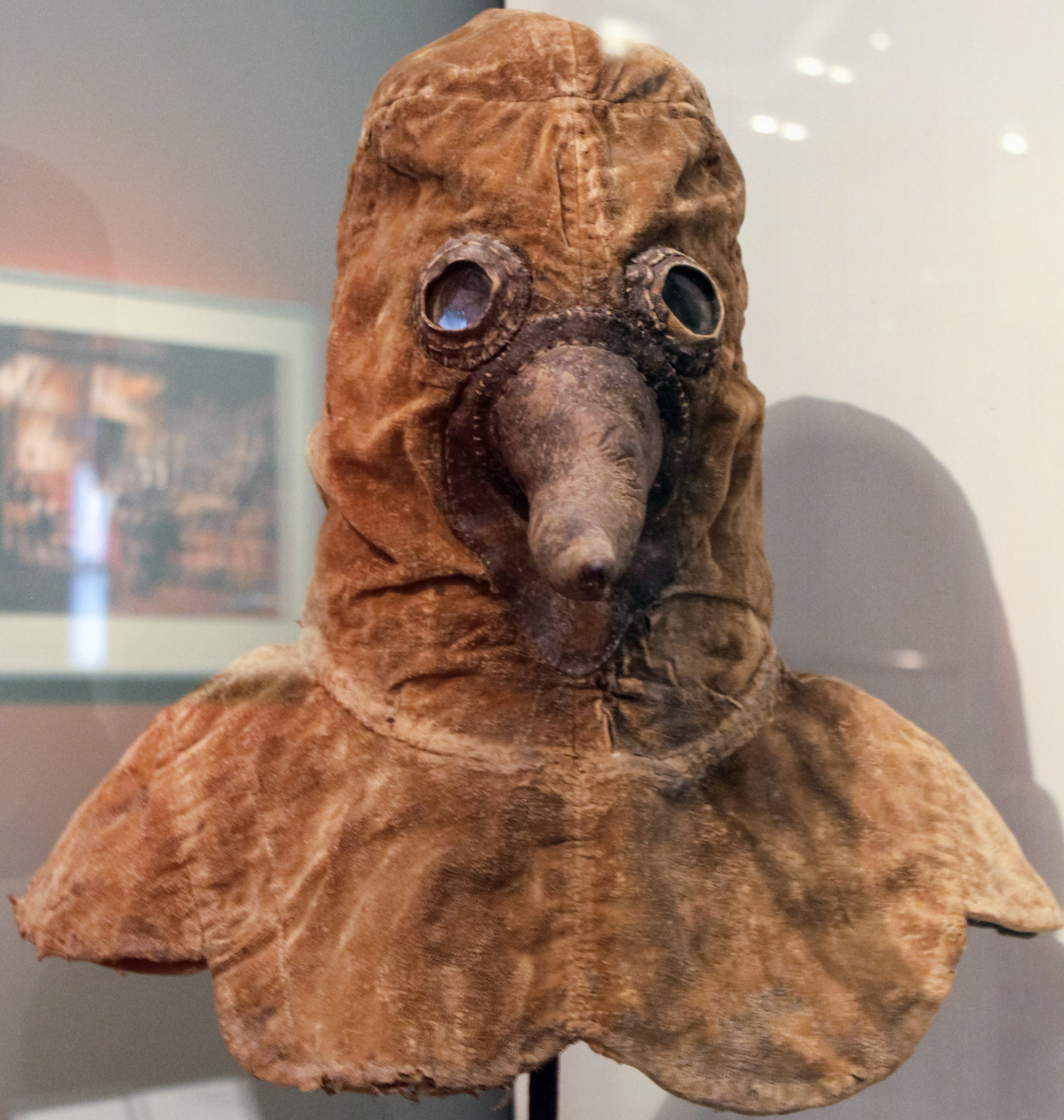
One of only two known surviving plague masks; dated between 1650 and 1750; held by the German Historical Museum, Berlin

Portrayals of the archetypal plague doctor costume of beak-like mask, ankle-length waxed overcoat, gloves, boots, wide-brimmed hat, linen hood, and overcoat date to the early modern period. Though these depictions come from satirical writings, political cartoons, and characters of theater; they may have been based in a historical reality. The origins of the plague costumes are unclear but have been traced to 17th century Italy and France. Plague doctors may have worn a mask of some form since at least 1373, when Johannes Jacobi recommended the use of masks, but Jacobi gives no physical description of the masks. There is no evidence linking the early modern archetypal image of the plague doctor costume to medieval plague doctors.

There are only two known artifacts of plague masks, both dated to the 17th century and both found in Germany. Despite contemporaneous outbreaks in other regions such as Italy, there is no historical evidence of plague in central Europe that would correspond to these masks. The masks are fabric hoods, with glass or crystal over the eyes and curved leather "beaks". It is notable that the glass-covered openings are too widely placed to provide for functional vision. One mask has two small nose holes and may have been used as a type of respirator which contained aromatic plants or substances.

The first known written description of an herbal-stuffed beak mask was during the 1656–1658 epidemic in Rome. The beak could hold dried flowers (like roses and carnations), herbs (like lavender and peppermint), camphor, copper, or a vinegar sponge, as well as juniper berry, ambergris, cloves, labdanum, myrrh, and storax. The herb-containing mask would have allowed for the doctor to use both hands in examining the patient. The purpose of aromatic contents of the mask was to protect the wearer from miasma, a pathogenic form of "bad air" thought to be evidenced by bad smells, such as the smells of sick patients or decaying bodies. The wide-brimmed leather hat helped to indicate a plague doctor's profession. They used wooden canes in order to point out areas needing attention and to examine patients without touching them. The canes were also used to keep people away. The doctor's long robe was made from linen because it was said contagion did not stick to linen as easily as other materials. The robe was sometimes made from goatskin, which was said to be stronger against the plague than linen because of its small pores and polished texture. The robe could be sealed with oil or wax for an extra layer of protection so the miasma could not seep through the holes of the linen material.

Though contemporary theories about the nature of plague transmission were somewhat incorrect, it is likely that this costume would have provided some protection. The garments covered the face and body, shielding against airborne droplets, splattered blood, and lymphatic fluid. The robe, being leather or waxed, prevented fleas from clinging to the wearers' clothes and infesting them. The costume of the plague doctor is one of the earliest examples of personal protective equipment in the medical profession.

=== Cultural depictions ===
Depictions of the beaked plague doctor rose in response to superstition and fear about the unknown source of the plague, symbolizing the foreboding of death. The beaked plague doctor inspired costumes in Italian theater as a symbol of general horror and death, though some historians insist that the plague doctor was originally fictional and inspired the protective garments of real plague doctors later.

While later sources based in other regions do claim that this costume was in use in their country (most specifically during the Black Death), it is possible that these sources were influenced by theater and other works of fiction. This well known costume now is used as common costume in festivals mainly in Europe and within the art of theater.

== Contract ==
Plague doctors were contracted by municipal administrators to treat bubonic plague patients. These contracts are present in European city archives. Historical examples of plague doctor contracts show contracts negotiated over questions of pay, housing, citizenship, service period, and scope of service. Part of the plague doctor's contractual agreement was to quarantine after seeing a plague patient, essentially living in isolation. Their contractual responsibility was to treat plague patients and no other type of patient, to prevent spreading the disease to the uninfected.

== Notable plague doctors ==
- In 1479 the city of Pavia contracted Giovanni de Ventura as a community plague doctor.
- Irish physician Niall Ó Glacáin earned deep respect in Spain, France and Italy for his bravery in treating numerous people with the plague.
- French anatomist Ambroise Paré and Swiss iatrochemist Paracelsus were famous Renaissance plague doctors.
- Nostradamus gave advice about preventive measures against the plague, such as the removal of infected corpses, getting fresh air, drinking clean water, and drinking a juice preparation of rose hips. In Traité des fardemens Part A Chapter VIII, Nostradamus also recommends to not bleed the patient.
- John Paulitious was Edinburgh's first plague doctor, but he died in June 1645 only weeks after beginning employment. He was succeeded by George Rae.
