= Louis Whirter =

Louis Whirter (also Louis Weierter or Louis Weirter; 1873, Edinburgh – 12 January 1932, Onslow Gardens, South Kensington) was a Scottish artist, etcher, illustrator and inventor who also designed posters for the Underground Group over the period 1931 to 1932.

== Quotes about Whirter ==
"He was an original member of the Scottish Society of Artists and exhibited at the Royal Academy, the Paris Salon and other exhibitions in many parts of the world. Of his war pictures, The Battle of Courcelette was bought for the national collection at Ottawa. Peronne is also at Ottawa, and War in the Air is in the British War Museum." — The ART NEWS: Vol 30, no 19, 2/6/1932

== Publications ==
- The Story Of Edinburgh Castle

== Gallery ==
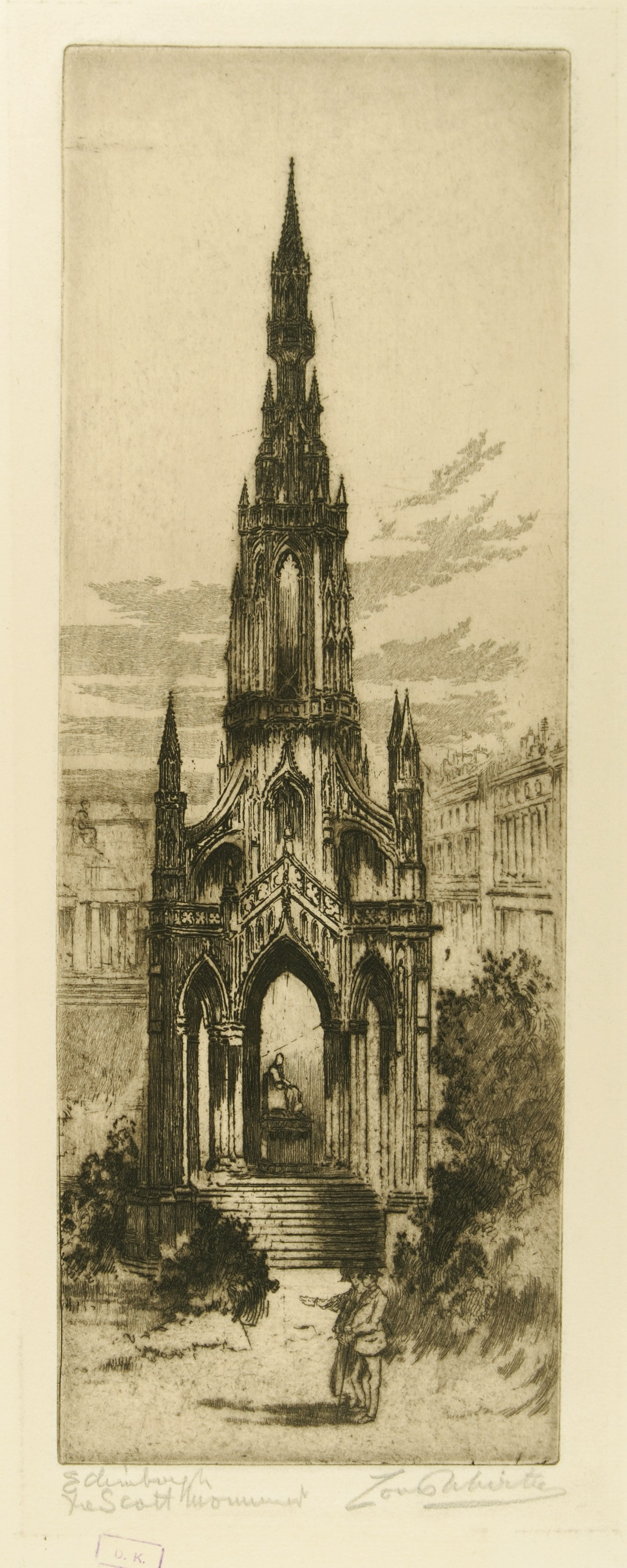
Scott Monument

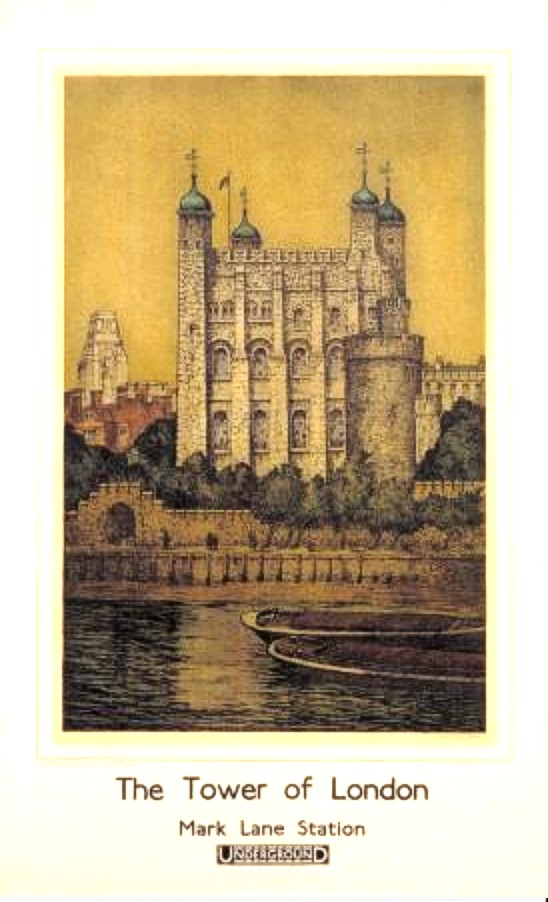
Tower of London

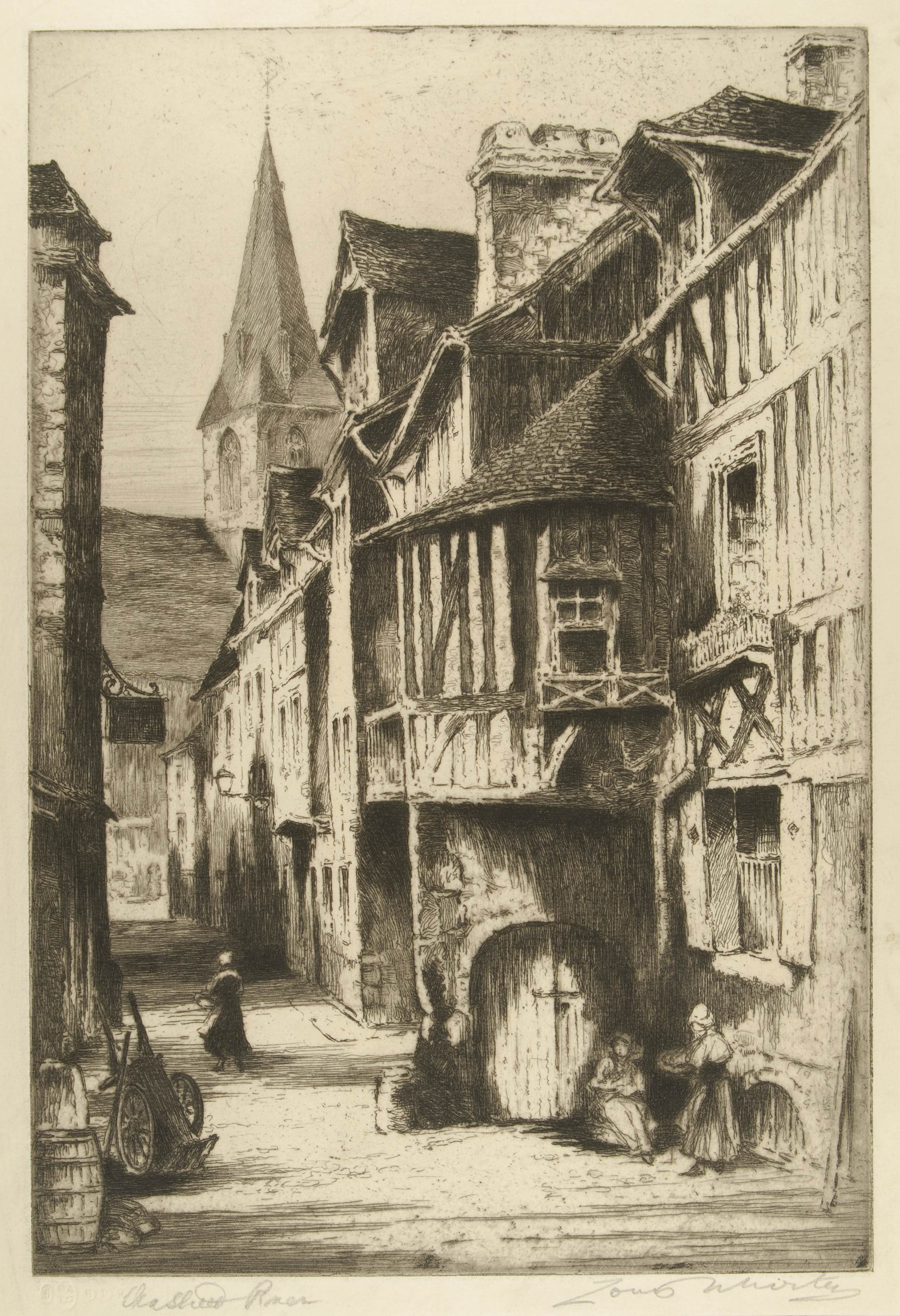
"Old Street, Rouen"
