= John Muir Wood =

Scottish musician, piano manufacturer and photographer (1805–1892)

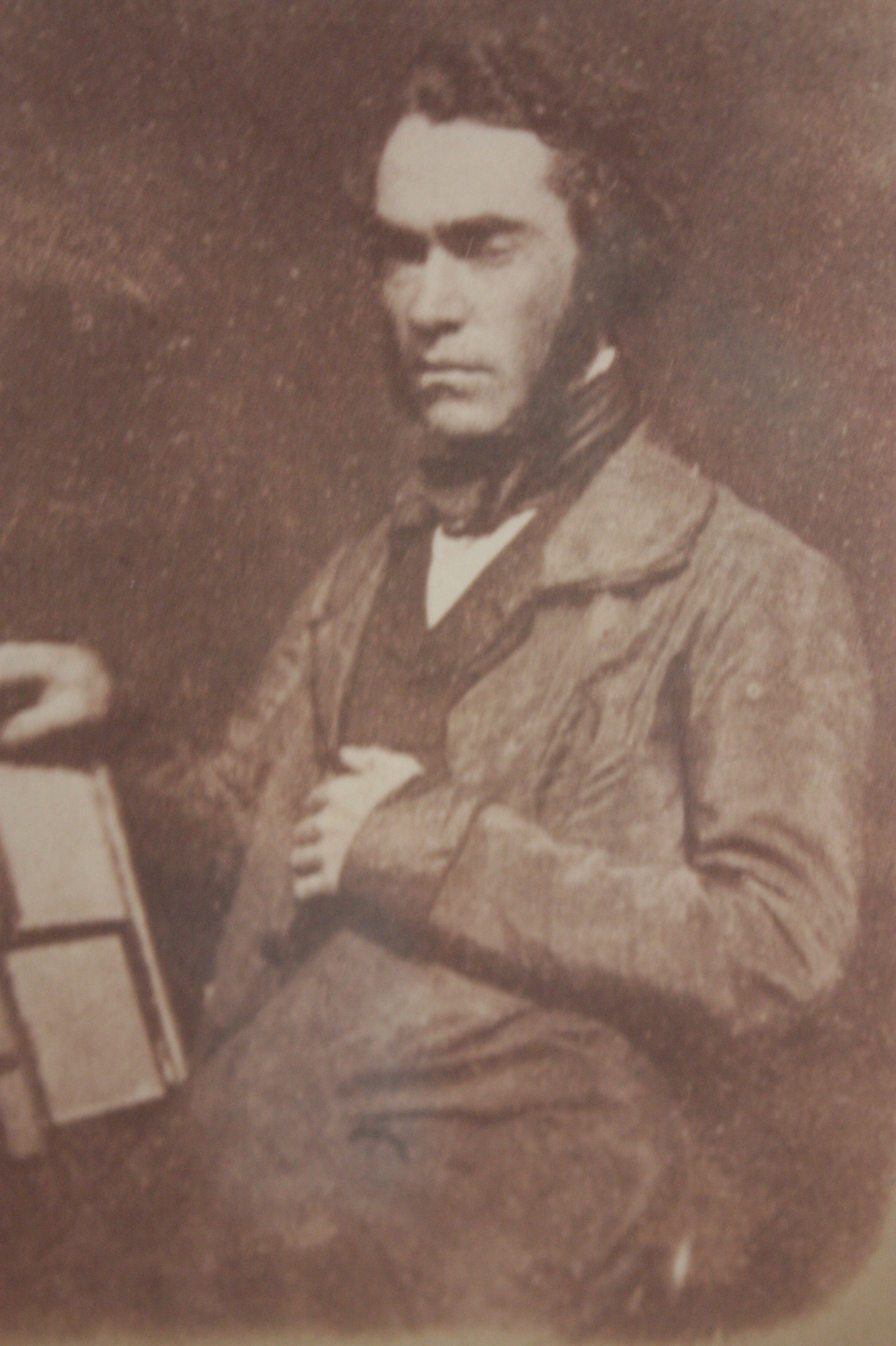
- John Muir Wood by Hill & Adamson, c. 1850
- Born: 31 July 1805; Edinburgh, Scotland
- Died: 25 June 1892 (aged 86); Cove, Dunbartonshire (now Argyll and Bute), Scotland
- Occupations: musician, piano maker, music publisher, amateur photographer

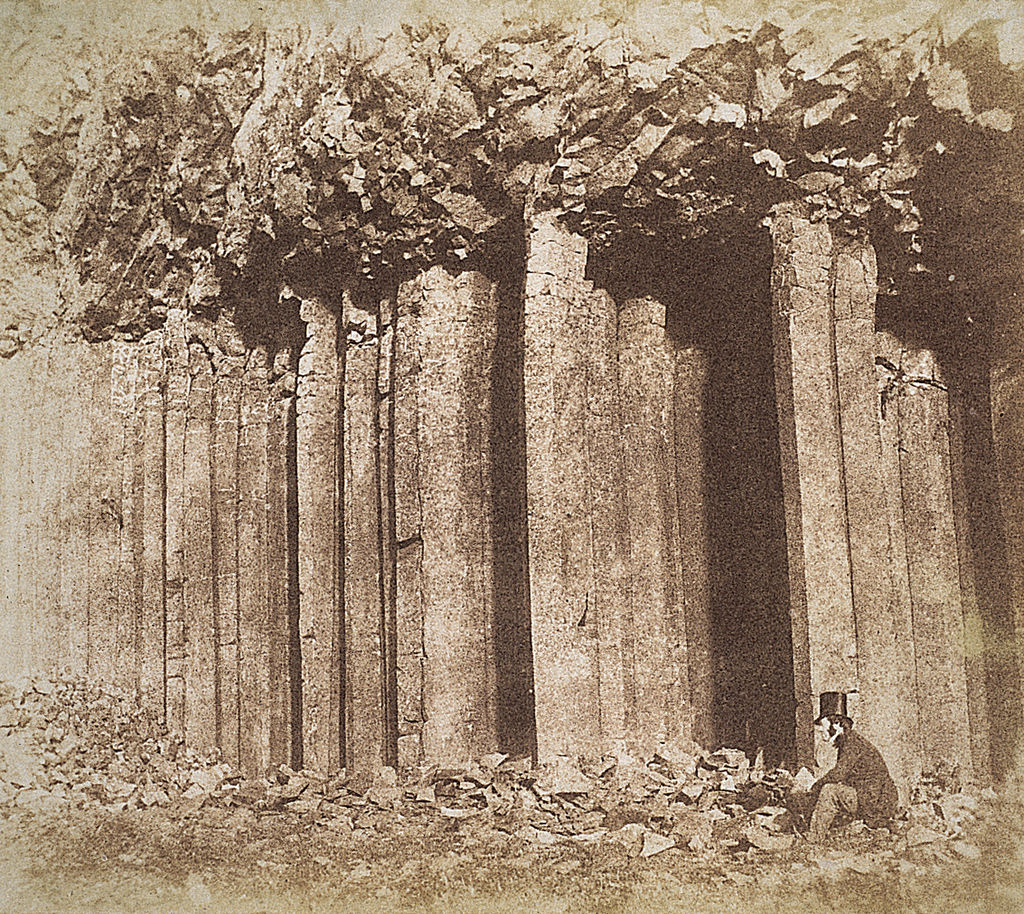
Landscape photograph by John Muir Wood

John Muir Wood (31 July 1805 – 25 June 1892) was a Scottish musician, piano maker, music publisher and an early amateur photographer.

== Early life ==
John Muir Wood was born in Edinburgh on 31 July 1805, the son of Andrew Wood and Jacobina Ferrier.

Wood's father was a partner in the Edinburgh piano manufacturing and music publishing firm of Muir, Wood and Company, and later Wood, Small and Company. In 1799 his company won a royal warrant as "Musical Instrument Makers of His Majesty."

Wood was named for his father's initial business partner, John Muir (d. 1818). His father's later business partner was George Small.

== Music ==
Wood's interest in music likely stemmed from his father's profession as a piano manufacturer and music publisher in Edinburgh. As a youth in Edinburgh Wood received training as a pianist, eventually travelling to Paris and Vienna to continue his musical studies.

In 1828 Wood returned to Edinburgh as a music teacher, later entering the family business. With his brothers, George (1812-1893) and Robert (1797-1871), he operated the piano and music publishing firm of Wood & Co. in Edinburgh. After relocating to Glasgow, Wood established John Muir Wood & Co. on Buchanan Street.

Wood's music businesses were quite successful and through his work he was involved in arranging many classical music concerts in Glasgow. One of those concerts was the visit of Frédéric Chopin to Scotland in 1848, which Wood coordinated with London-based piano-manufacturer James Shudi Broadwood.

In 1884, Wood edited a new edition of George Farquhar Graham's "Songs of Scotland".

== Photography ==
Wood never pursued photography for profit. The focus of his photographs included individual portraits, group scenes, streetscapes, ruins and rural landscapes. He travelled to remote locations for his photography.

Wood's knowledge of photography may date from his friendship in the 1840s with the eye surgeon Dr. Jasper MacAldin, who shared his knowledge of optics and chemistry. MacAldin was also a subject in several of Wood's portraits.

In 1841, Wood toured the west of Scotland with landscape painter James Eckford Lauder (1811-1869).

After settling in Glasgow, Wood took paddle steamers, as well as more traditional boats, to explore and photograph the Clyde, Largs, Arran, the Isle of Bute and other Scottish locales.

Wood produced his photographs using a calotype process. He also experimented with the addition of various metals, such as copper, tin, gold and uranium in an attempt to produce different color tones and more permanent images.

Wood's collection of more than 900 images, believed by experts to be the first serious series of landscape pictures of Scotland, are part of the collection of the National Galleries of Scotland. An exhibit of this collection was held at the National Gallery of Scotland in 2008. The collection is permanently held at the Scottish National Portrait Gallery.

A selection of Wood's photographs, entitled "Photography of John Muir Wood", by Sarah Stevenson, et al., was published in 1988.

== Personal life ==
On 22 January 1851 in Gorbals, Lanark, Scotland, John Muir Wood married Helen Kemlo Stephen. The couple raised a large family together.

Muir Wood died at Cove, Dunbartonshire (now Argyll and Bute), Scotland on 25 June 1892. Wood's body was returned to Glasgow and was buried in the Glasgow Necropolis.

John Muir Wood is the great-grandfather of Sir Alan Muir Wood (1921-2009), a British civil engineer known as the father of modern tunneling. Sir Alan and his son, Dr. Paul Muir Wood, were instrumental in donating John Muir Woods photographic images to the National Galleries of Scotland.

== See also ==
- History of photography
