= Karteek Clarke =

English swimmer and ultra distance runner (born 1966)

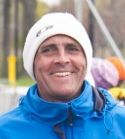

Personal information
- Born: August 26, 1966 (age 59) Edinburgh, Scotland, Great Britain

Sport
- Sport: Swimming

Karteek Clarke (born Alexander Clarke, 26 August 1966) is an English Channel swimmer and ultra distance runner from Edinburgh, Scotland.

== Life ==
Clarke gained an MA Hons degree in psychology from the University of Edinburgh in 1989 and an LLB degree from the University of Glasgow in 2011. He has worked as an English teacher and as a freelance trainer in motivation and communications skills. Clarke credits studying meditation under Sri Chinmoy for the inspiration and encouragement to try and swim the channel. Karteek is an Indian spiritual name given by Sri Chinmoy and means "warrior".

He did not succeed on his first attempt at swimming the English Channel in 1994. But, since then, has become the first Scottish person to complete more than two crossings and has now completed 11 crossings, of the English Channel. Michael Oram, honorary secretary of the English Channel Swimming and Piloting Federation, said: "Very few people have swam [sic] the Channel more than ten times, and while Mr Clarke has his spiritual motivations, others are motivated by the challenge."

== Crossings of the English Channel ==
Number	Year	Time
1	1997	11:57
2	2000	14:52
3	2001	12:49
4	2002	10:53
5	2003	16:05
6	2005	16:13
7	2005	13:31
8	2006	16:18
9	2008	14:54
10	2009	16:49
11	2014	19:01
