= Robert Mylne (writer) =

Scottish writer, antiquarian and engraver (1643–1747)

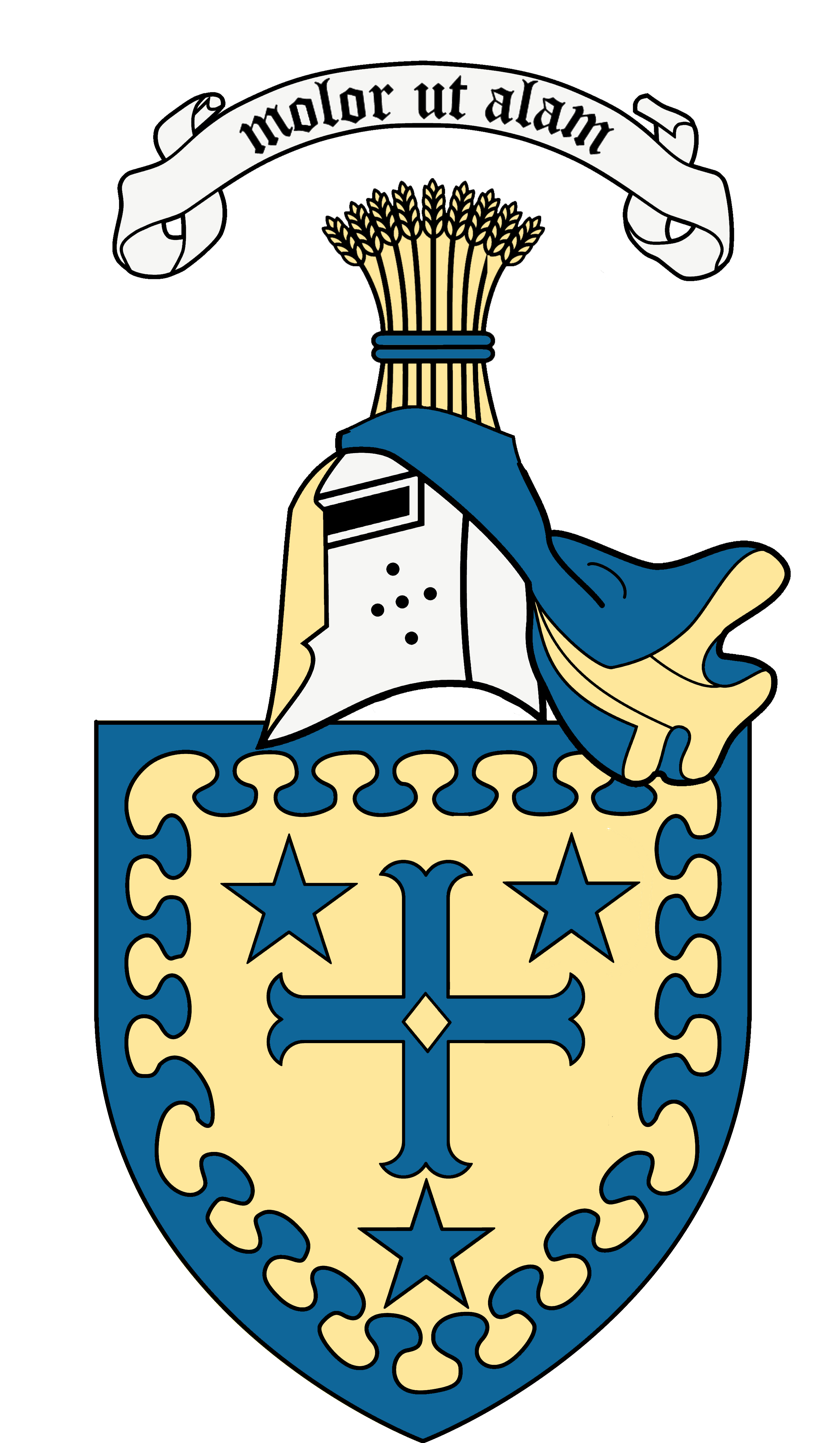
Robert Mylne's coat of arms

Robert Mylne (circa November 1643–21 November 1747) was a Scottish writer of pasquils, and antiquary. He is generally described as a writer of Edinburgh, but also as an engraver.

== Career ==
He gained notoriety by his bitter and often scurrilous political squibs against the whigs, but he also devoted much time and labour to copying manuscripts of antiquarian and historical interest. George Crawfurd, in the preface to his History of the Shire of Renfrew, acknowledges his indebtedness to the "vast collections of public records" belonging to Mylne, "a person well known to be indefatigable in the study of Scots antiquities". Among Mylne's other friends was Archibald Pitcairne.

He was probably born in November 1643, and may have been related to Sir Robert Mylne of Barnton. Mylne married on 29 August 1678, in the Tolbooth Church, Edinburgh, Barbara, second daughter of John Govean, minister at Muckhart, Perthshire; she died on 11 December 1725, having had twelve children, all of whom, except one daughter, Margaret, predeceased their father. The eldest son, also named Robert, became an engraver, and engraved plates for Sir Robert Sibbald's Miscellanea Quaedam Eruditae Antiquitatis, and Alexander Nisbet's System of Heraldry.

Many of Mylne's pasquils were separately issued in his lifetime, but others were circulated only in manuscript. From a collection brought together by Mylne's son Robert, James Maidment published, with an introduction and a few similar compositions by other writers, A Book of Scottish Pasquils, 3 pts., Edinburgh, 1827; another edition appeared in 1868. In the Advocates' Library, Edinburgh, there is a pamphlet, apparently by Mylne, entitled The Oath of Abjuration Considered, 1712, 4to, and a complete manuscript catalogue of Mylne's printed broadsides.

Mylne died in Edinburgh on 21 November 1747, aged 103, according to some accounts, and 105, according to others, and was buried on the anniversary of his birthday.
