= James Seth =

Scottish philosopher

James Seth (1860 – 24 July 1924) was a Scottish philosopher. His older brother was Andrew Seth Pringle-Pattison, also a philosopher. Their father, Smith Kimont Seth, was the son of a farmer from the Scottish region of Fife and a bank clerk in the head office of the Commercial Bank of Scotland. Their mother, Margaret, was the daughter of Andrew Little, a farmer from Berwickshire. An elder brother died in infancy.

Seth was born in 1860 in Edinburgh and attended George Watson's College. He was a student of Alexander Campbell Fraser and Henry Calderwood, and won two scholarships. He then went on to Divinity and ordination via a theology degree at New College, Edinburgh.

In 1898, he took the Chair of Moral Philosophy at the University of Edinburgh which he occupied for 26 years. During most of this time, the corresponding Chair of Logic and Metaphysics was occupied by his brother Andrew Seth. James's inaugural lecture on "The Scottish Contribution to Moral Philosophy" was subsequently published in The Philosophical Review, the journal he had edited. Seth was an active campaigner on temperance and education. He died in Edinburgh in 1924.

== Publications ==
- A Study of Ethical Principles, Blackwood and Charles Scribner, 1894.
- Essays in Ethics and Religion with Other Papers, William Blackwood, Edinburgh and London, 1926.
