= John Paulitious =

Edinburgh plague doctor

John Paulitious (died June 1645) was Edinburgh's first plague doctor. He died in June 1645 of bubonic plague within weeks of tending the sick. At the time, there was a severe epidemic of this disease in Edinburgh; it's believed that there were only about 60 men around to defend the city at the height of the epidemic.

His successor was George Rae, who was appointed on 13 June 1645. He was promised an enormous sum of money ("£100 a month") for this position, as it was expected that he, too, would die before he could collect; however, Rae survived and spent ten years attempting to collect his promised payment, but it is widely believed that he died without ever receiving it.
