= A Short Biographical Dictionary of English Literature =

Collection of biographies of writers by John William Cousin

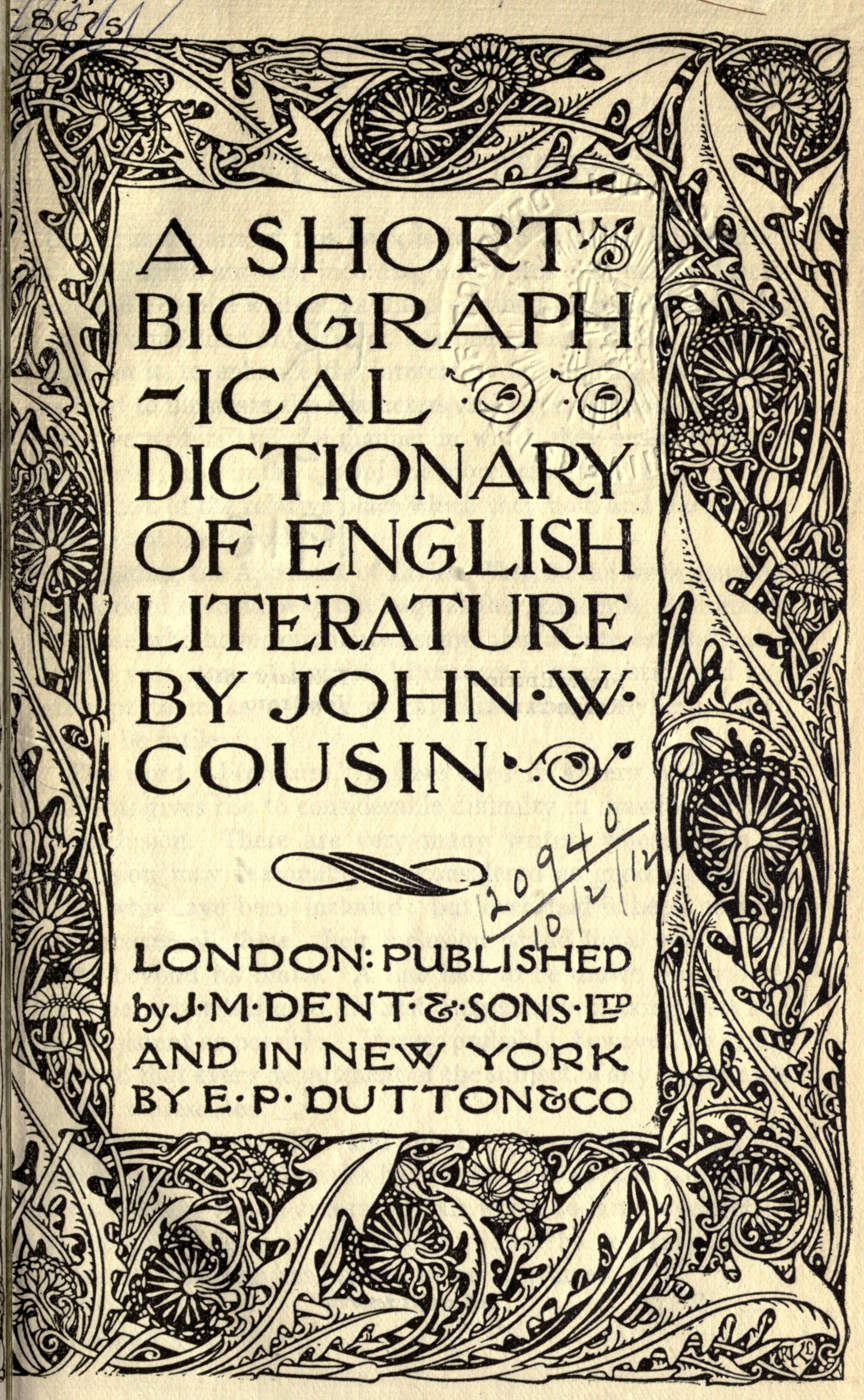
Title page

A Short Biographical Dictionary of English Literature is a collection of biographies of writers by John William Cousin (1849–1910), published in 1910. Most of the entries consist of only one paragraph but some entries, like William Shakespeare's, are quite lengthy.

The book was the 5,000th e-book provided by the Distributed Proofreaders project to Project Gutenberg, where it was released on August 21, 2004.
