= George Small (piano maker) =

George Small (1782–1861) was a partner of the Scottish piano manufacturing firm of Muir, Wood and Company, an Edinburgh magistrate and a philanthropist.

== Early life ==
George Small was born on 26 May 1782 in Edinburgh, Scotland, the son of George Small and Ann Spalding.

As a youth Small joined a fencible regiment raised to fight Napoleon Bonaparte, serving for a time in Gibraltar. Small served with his friend and connection Sir Archibald Campbell, Baronet, then a Captain in the Army. In 1802, when that unit was disbanded, Small was approached to join the regular army but opted to leave the military to pursue business endeavors.

George Small married Elizabeth Grindlay in Edinburgh on 13 February 1808. The couple had several children, including Rev. James Grindlay Small, a noted Scottish hymnist and the author of the hymn, "I've Found A Friend, Oh! Such A Friend."

== Business ventures ==
Muir, Wood and Company was a piano manufacturing and music publishing firm in Edinburgh, Scotland. The firm had been started in 1798 by John Muir and Andrew Wood. In addition to pianos, the firm made organs (church, chamber and barrel), harps, violins, cellos, tambourines, triangles, drums and serpents. By 1799 the company had won a royal warrant as the "Musical Instrument Makers of His Majesty."

In 1804, George Small joined the firm to run the retail end of the business.

Muir, Wood and Company operated until John Muir's death in 1818. After Muir's death, Andrew Wood and George Small continued in business, but on a reduced scale, under the name Wood, Small and Company. Wood, Small and Company operated until Andrew Wood's death in 1829, after which George Small formed Small, Bruce and Company.

== Philanthropy ==
Small's 1861 obituary included the following assessment by Professor Wallace of George Small's philanthropic pursuits: "In truth, his (George Small's) whole life seems to me to be consecrated to the service of the poor." Serving as an Edinburgh magistrate, he is chiefly known as the founder of the House of Refuge for the Destitute and the Lock Hospital in Edinburgh.

Small also served as a member of the Board of Health. During the cholera outbreak in the city, Small suspended his business activities, and with his family, went daily to work in the soup kitchen, the clothing store and other charitable operations associated with the (temporary) cholera hospital in Edinburgh.

After the cholera outbreak subsided, he was named treasurer of the Charity Workhouse.

== Retirement ==
In 1848 he retired from business and public life, moving to a cottage in Dunkeld. After several years there, he and his wife went to live with their son James at the Free Manse church in Bervie, Aberdeenshire, Scotland.

Small died on 11 July 1861 in Bervie and is buried in the Old Kirk cemetery there.
